= Dog type =

Categorization of dogs

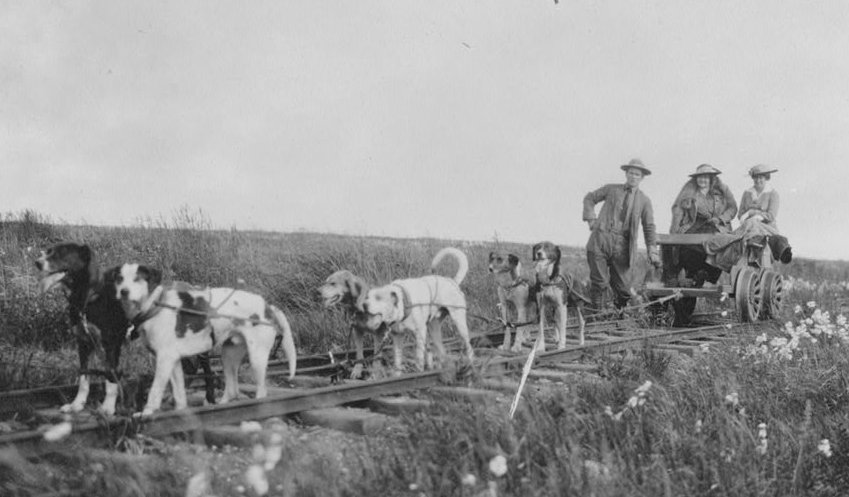
Cart dogs, c. 1900; different in appearance but doing the same work

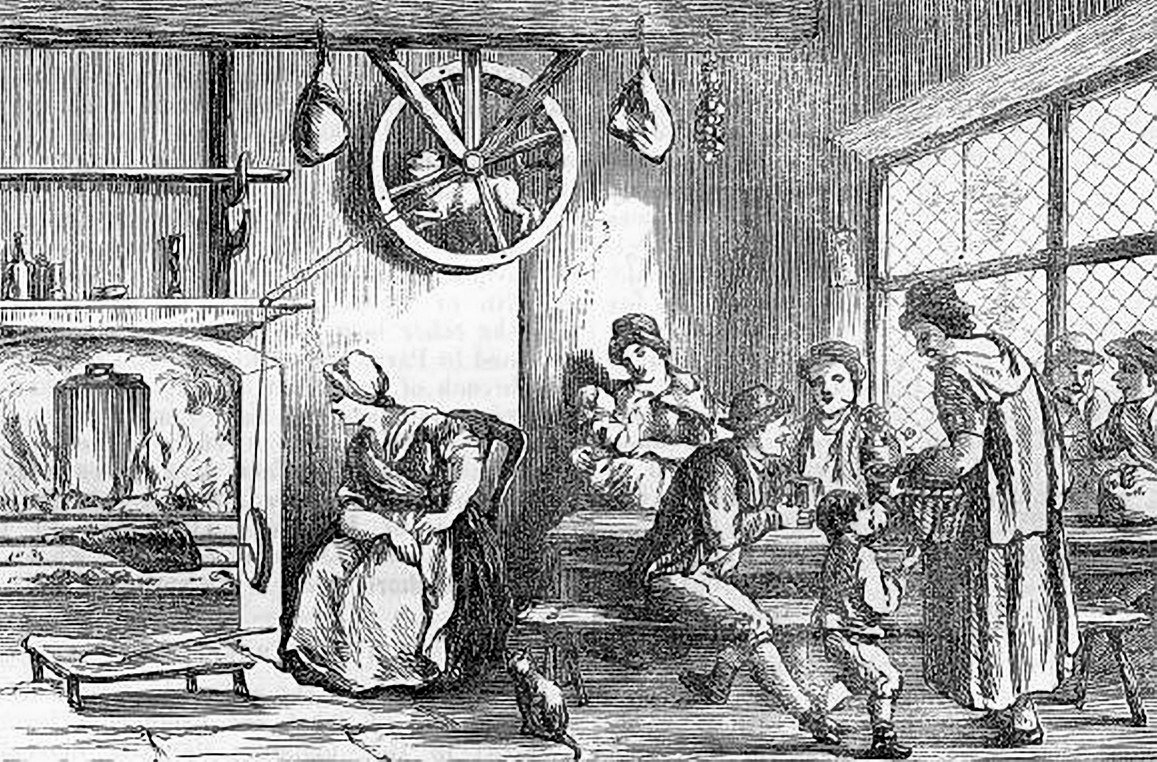
An extinct Turnspit dog, 1800

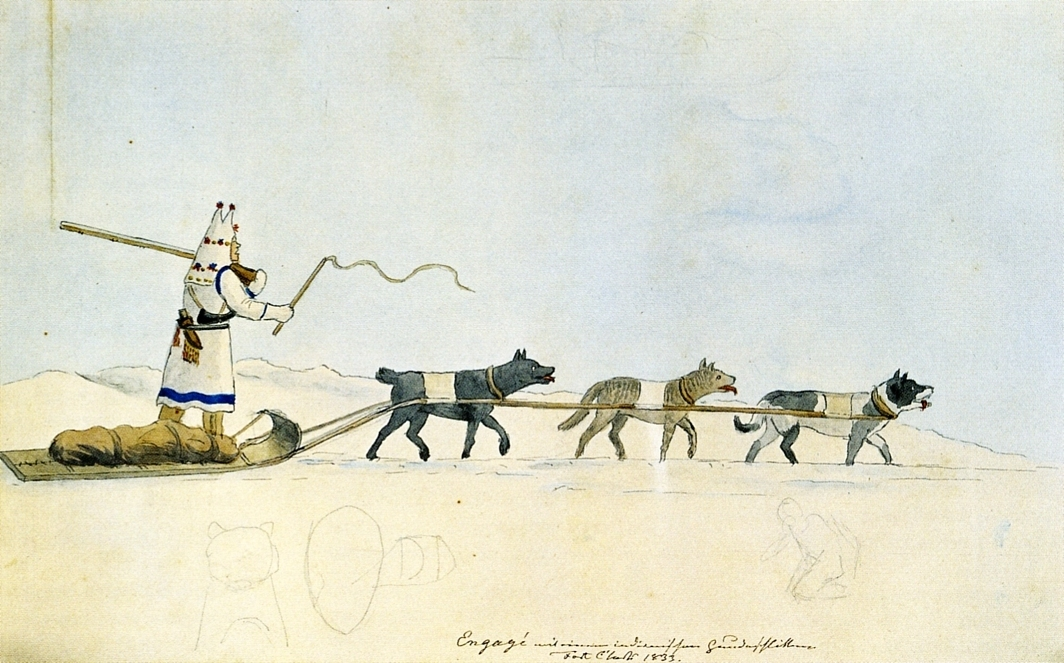
Sled dogs, 1833

Dog types are broad categories of domestic dogs based on form, function, style of work, lineage, or appearance. Some may be locally adapted dog types (or landraces) that may have the visual characteristics of a modern purebred dog. In contrast, modern dog breeds strictly adhere to long-established breed standards,^{[note 1]} that began with documented foundation breeding stock sharing a common set of inheritable characteristics, developed by long-established, reputable kennel clubs that recognize the dog as a purebred.

A "dog type" can be referred to broadly, as in gun dog, or more specifically, as in spaniel. Dogs raised and trained for a specific working ability rather than appearance may not closely resemble other dogs doing the same work, or any of the dogs of the analogous breed group of purebred dogs.

== Names in English ==
The earliest books in the English language to mention numbers of dog types are from the "Cynegetica" (hunting literature), namely, The Art of Venery (1327) by Twiti (Twici), a treatise that describes hunting with the limer (a leashed bloodhound type); the pack of running hounds, which included barcelets and brachetz (both scent hounds); and the sighthound and greyhound. More significant in recording the use and description of various dog types is The Master of Game (circa 1406) by Edward of York, a treatise that describes dogs and their work, such as the alaunt, greyhound, pack scent hounds, spaniel, and mastiff, used by the privileged and wealthy for hunting purposes. The Master of Game is a combination of the earlier Art of Venery and the French hunting treatise Livre de Chasse by Gaston Phoebus (circa 1387). The Book of Saint Albans, published in 1486, a "school" book about hawking, hunting, fishing, and heraldry, attributed to Juliana Berners (Barnes), lists dogs of the time mainly by function: "First there is a greyhound, a bastard, a mongrel, a mastiff, a limer, a spaniel, "raches" (small-to-medium-sized scenthounds), "kennets" (small hunting dogs), terriers, "butcher's hounds", dung-heap dogs, "trundel tails" (lapdogs?) and prick-eared curs, and small ladies puppies that bear away the fleas and diverse small sorts."

Almost 100 years later, another book in English, De Canibus Britannicus, by the author/physician John Caius, translated (Fleming) from Latin in 1576, attempted the first systematic approach to defining different types of dogs in various categories, demonstrating an apparent increase in types and population. "English dogs": the gentle (i.e., well-bred) kind, serving game—harriers, terriers, bloodhounds, gazehounds, greyhounds, limers, tumblers, and stealers; "the homely kind"; "the currish kind", toys; "Fowling dogs"—setters and spaniels; as well as the pastoral or shepherd types, mastiffs or bandogs, and various village dogs. Subtypes describing the function of dogs in each group were also included.^{[note 2]}

== Dog types and modern breeds ==
"It is important", reminded Anne Rogers Clark and Andrew Brace, "not to claim great age for breeds, though it is quite legitimate to claim considerable antiquity for types of dogs". Attempts to classify dogs into different 'species' show that dog types could be quite distinctive, from the Canis melitaeus of lapdogs descended from ancient Roman pet dogs to the even more ancient Canis molossus, the Molossus types, to the Canis saultor, the dancing mongrel of beggars. These types were uniform enough to appear to have been selectively bred, but as Raymond Coppinger wrote, "Natural processes can produce, could produce, and do produce populations of unusual and uniform dogs, that is, dogs with a distinctive conformation." Human manipulation was very indirect. In a very few cases emperors, monasteries, or wealthy hunters might maintain lines of special dogs, from which we have today's Pekingese, St. Bernards, and foxhounds.

At the beginning of the 19th century, there were only a few dogs identified as breeds, but when dog fighting was outlawed in England in 1835, a new sport of dog showing began. Along with this sport came rules, written records, and closed stud books. Dog fanciers began refining breeds from the various types of dogs in use. Some of the old types no longer needed for work (such as the wolfhound) were remade and kept from extinction as show dogs, and other old types were refined into many new breeds. Sometimes, multiple new breeds might be born in the same litter of puppies. In 1873, only forty breeds and varieties were known; today, there are many hundreds of breeds, some 400 of them recognized by the Fédération Cynologique Internationale (FCI) alone. Dog types today are recognized in the names of Group or Section categories of dog breed registries. Named types of dogs that are not dog breeds are still being used where function or use is more important than appearance, especially for herding or hunting, as with the herding dog types of New Zealand that are described by their exact function (Heading Dog, Huntaway, Stopping Dog, etc.—functional terms, not necessarily breed names).

== Other uses of the word '"type" in dogs ==
For biologists, a "type" fixes a name to a taxon. Dog fanciers use the term "breed type" in the sense of "qualities (as of bodily contour and carriage) that are felt to indicate excellence in members of a group". "Breed type" is specific to each dog breed's written standard. A dog that closely resembles the appearance laid out in the standard is said to be "typey". "Type" also is used to refer to "dogs of a well established line", an identifiable style of dog within the "breed type", usually from a specific kennel.

== Trainability and boldness ==
In 2011, a study found that herding dogs were more trainable than hounds, toy dogs, and non-sporting dogs. Sporting dogs were more trainable than non-sporting dogs. Terriers were bolder than hounds and herding dogs. Breeds with ancient Asian or African origin were less trainable than breeds in the herding/sighthound cluster and the hunting breeds. Breeds in the mastiff/terrier cluster were bolder than the ancient breeds, the breeds in the herding/sighthound cluster, and the hunting breeds.

== See also ==
- List of dog breeds

== Notes ==
Note 1: Every modern dog breed has a written "standard" that describes in detail aspects of its appearance. Modern breed standards are the basis of the sport of dog showing, as each dog is compared against the ideal of the written standard, and awards are based on how closely the dog resembles the standard. Their origin comes from the earliest European cynegetica: on a "sound hunting dog" see Xenophon, and the "correct type" of good sighthound, the vertragus, see Arrian.

Note 2: Many modern breeds of dogs still use the names of early types, although they may or may not resemble the original types.
