= Jacopo Brocardo =

Italian religious figure

Jacopo Brocardo (Anglicised as James Brocard(e), Latin: Jacobus Brocardus Pedemontanus) (c.1518 – 1594?) was an Italian Protestant convert and biblical interpreter. He regarded the year 1584 as the inauguration of a major new cycle. He prophesied that the last age would last 120 years from the birth of Martin Luther in 1483. As an apocalyptic thinker he was influenced by Martin Cellarius.

== Life ==
He was born in Pinerolo around 1518. He became a scholar and grammarian, and a follower of Giulio Camillo.

Brocardo is not considered a very reliable witness to his own biography. He was in France in the late 1540s, and he met Martin Bucer. On his own account, he became a Protestant convert in 1563. He was arrested in Cividale del Friuli in 1565. When questioned by the Inquisition, he admitted reading forbidden works, by Johann Carion, Johann Reuchlin, Paul Riccius and Cornelius Agrippa. In time the Council of Ten released him, or he escaped or bribed his guards; and he went to northern Europe. There he found a friend, patron and supporter in Jacques de Ségur-Pardaillan, encountered in Heidelberg, where he was from 1573. Ségur was also a significant diplomat for the anti-Ligue forces in France, in the period 1583 to 1585. Jacques Auguste de Thou was under the impression that Ségur was trying to implement Brocardo's prophetic and ecumenical vision, to the benefit of Henry of Navarre. Brocardo was in England around 1580 and in the Netherlands where he then studied at Leiden; it is suggested he may have followed the movements of Ségur of the period.

Brocardo lived an itinerant life. He was a member of Reformed churches in France and the Netherlands, where he was not comfortable, before moving to Bremen (1585). He ended his life in Nuremberg, where he was from 1591. There he was welcomed by the circle of Joachim Camerarius, and knew Jacques Bongars in 1594.

== Works ==
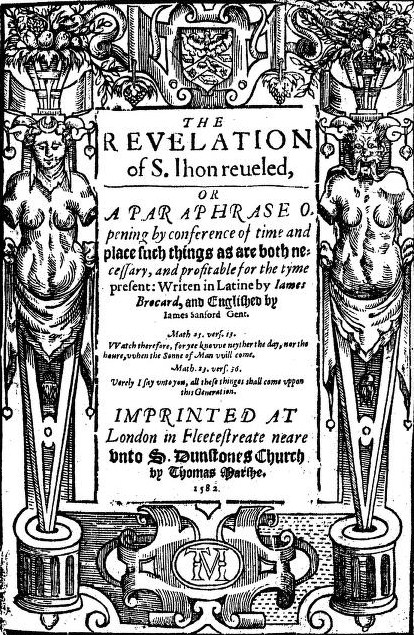
Title page of The Revelation of St. Jhon reveled (1582) by Jacopo Brocardo

Brocardo wrote a number of humanist works in earlier life. After a break he began publishing biblical exegesis.

An interpreter of Joachim of Fiore, Brocardo wrote an apocalypse commentary. His intention was support the Huguenot cause in the French Wars of Religion, though the work was not acceptable to some orthodox Calvinists. His extreme views, with those of William Fulke and John Napier, were picked up by Catholic polemicists. Synods at La Rochelle (1581) and Vitré (1583) banned this kind of exegesis. In 1581, also, the synod at Middelburg expressed problems with his views; Lambert Daneau and Martin Lydius were asked to reason with him.

Brocardo discussed a threefold coming of Jesus Christ. The sixth seal of Joachim was interpreted as the Protestant Reformation, and he took Savonarola to be a final Elijah. Brocardo used gematria and Ezekiel's Wheel. He was a Christian Kabbalist.

These ideas proved more acceptable to nonconforming Protestants, and a similar theory by Julius Sperber circulated at the end of the century. The work was translated into English in 1582, by James Sanford. His ideas influenced Simon Studion, and Tobias Hess. Via Christoph Besold Brocardo's prediction on the conversion of the Jews made its way into the work of Heinrich Alsted.

Brocardo's writings were influential also on the dialogue Gli eroici furori of Giordano Bruno.
