= Dog breed =

Group of closely related and visibly similar domestic dogs

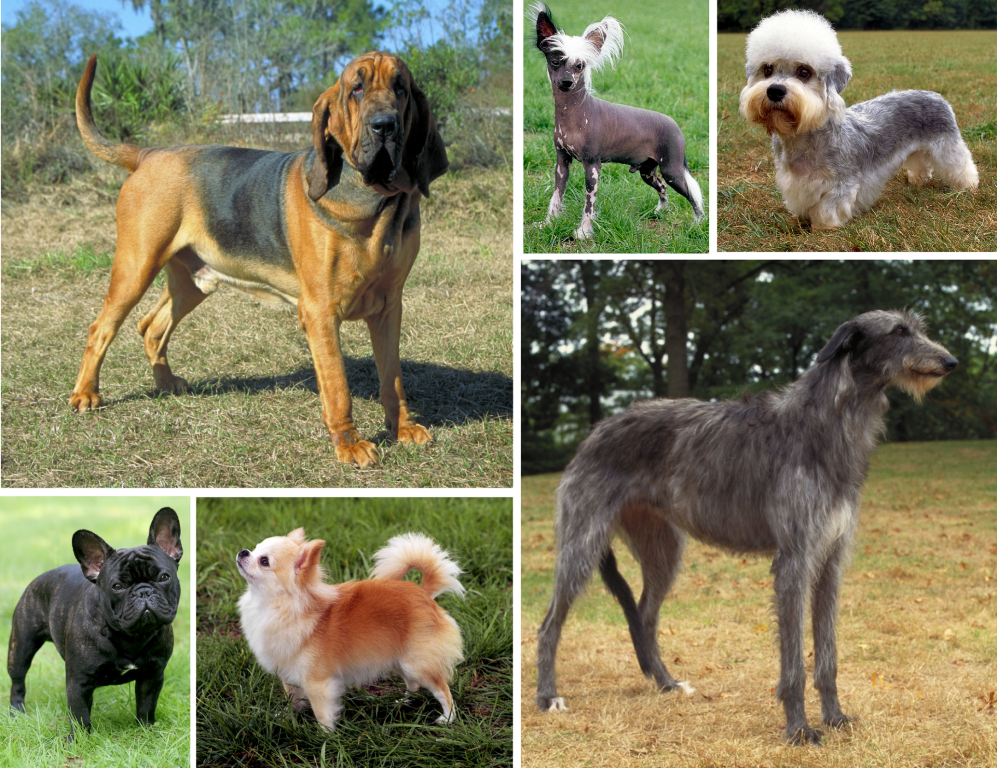
Montage showing the morphological variation of the dog.

A dog breed is a particular type of dog that was purposefully bred by humans to perform specific tasks, such as herding, hunting, and guarding. Dogs are the most variable mammal on Earth, with artificial selection producing upward of 360 globally recognized breeds. These breeds possess distinct traits related to morphology, which include body size and shape, tail phenotype, fur type, etc., but are only one species of dog. Their behavioral traits include guarding, herding, and hunting, and personality traits such as hypersocial behavior, boldness, and aggression. Most breeds were derived from small numbers of founders within the last 200 years. Because of their adaptability and usefulness to humans, dogs are the most abundant carnivore species worldwide.

A dog breed will consistently produce the physical traits, movement and temperament that were developed over decades of selective breeding. For each breed they recognize, kennel clubs and breed registries usually maintain and publish a breed standard which is a written description of the ideal specimen of the breed. Other uses of the term breed when referring to dogs include pure breeds, cross-breeds, mixed breeds and natural breeds.

Prior to the standardization of dog breeds, there were many different types of dogs that were defined by their own, unique factors. Many different terms were used to describe dogs, such as breed, strain, type, kind, and variety. By the end of the Victorian era, society had changed and so did the role of dogs. The form was given a more prominent role than function. Different types or breeds of dog were being developed by breeders who wanted to define specific characteristics and desirable features in their dogs. Driven by dog shows and the groups that hosted them, the term dog breed took on an entirely new meaning. Dog show competitions included best-in-breed winners, and the purebreds were winning. Breed standards are the reason the breed came to be, and with those standards are key features, including form, function and fitness for purpose. The Kennel Club in the UK was founded in 1873, and was the world's first national kennel club and breed registry. The International Canine Federation (ICF) was founded in 1911 as a worldwide organization. Its objective is to bring global uniformity to the breeding, exhibiting and judging of pure-bred dogs. The ICF has 99 member countries. According to BigThink, over 40% of the world's dog breeds come from the United Kingdom, France and Germany. It states: "Great Britain and France are the ground zero of dog fancying, with 57 registered breeds each. Germany is not far behind, with 47 breeds. These three countries alone represent more than 40% of all dog breeds recognized by the Fédération Cynologique Internationale."

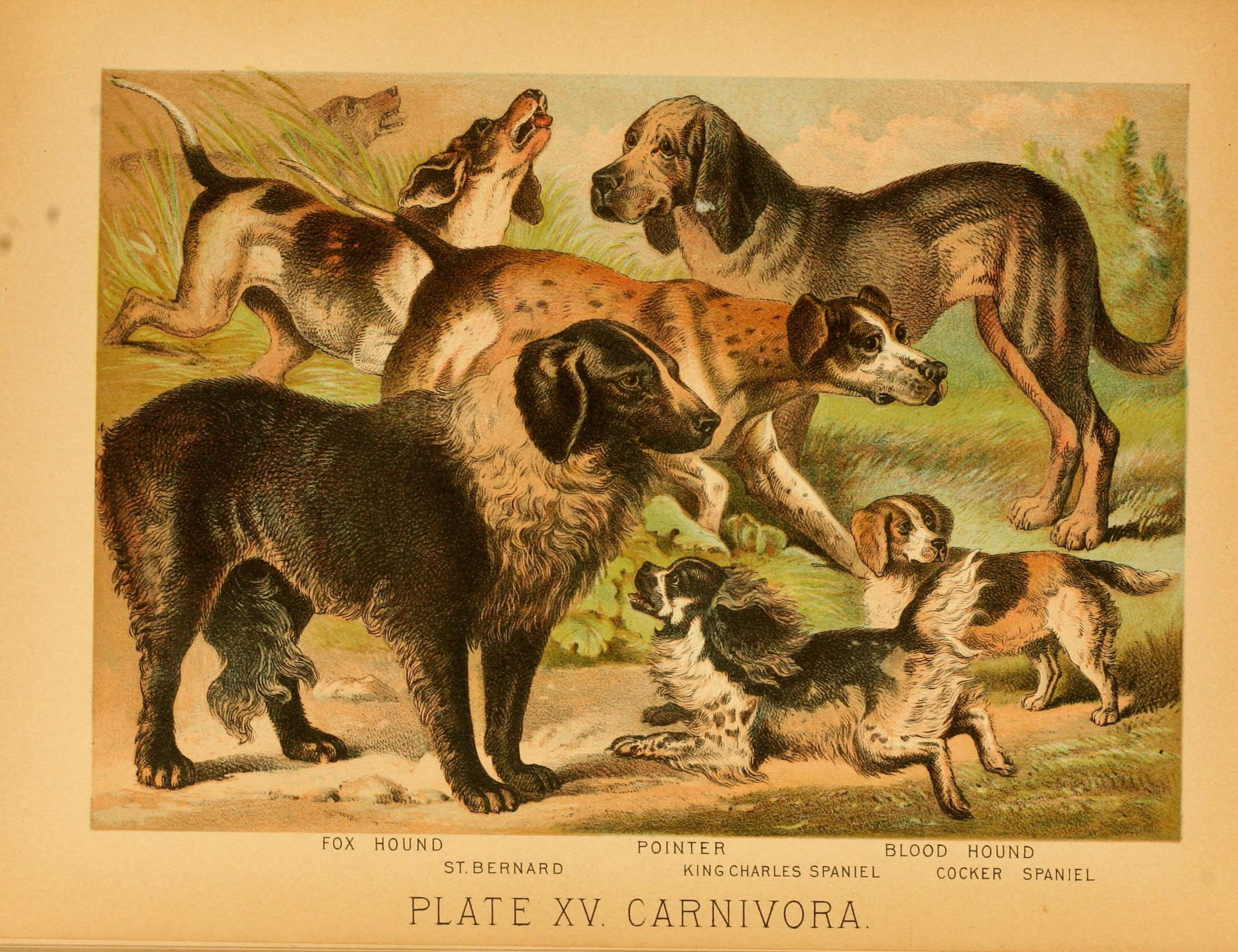
An 1897 illustration showing a range of European dog breeds

== First dog breeds ==
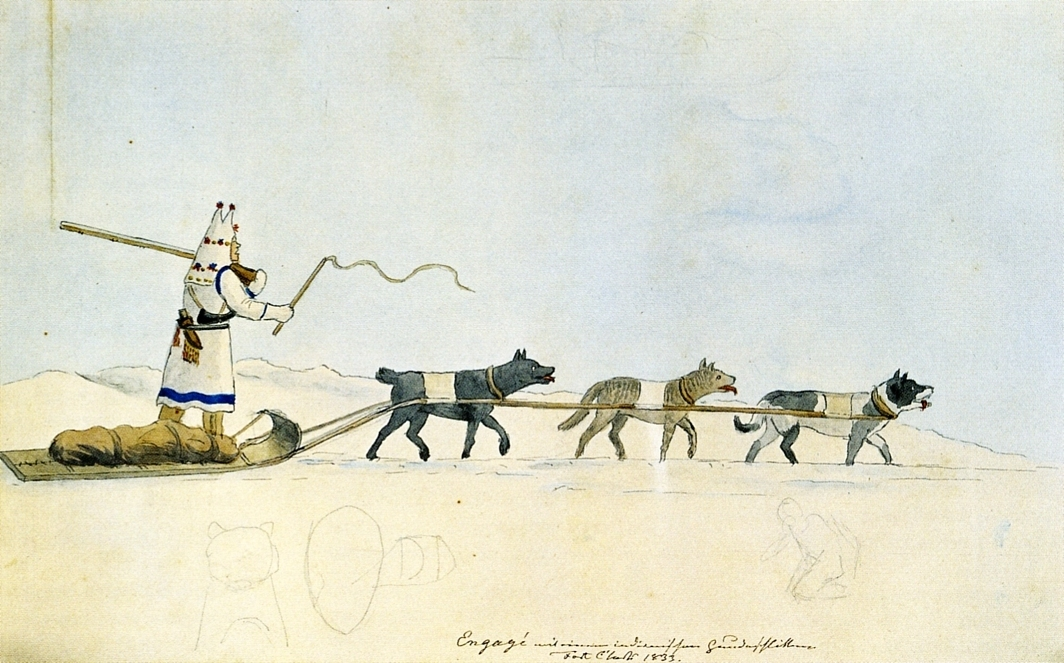
Sled dog types, sketched in 1833

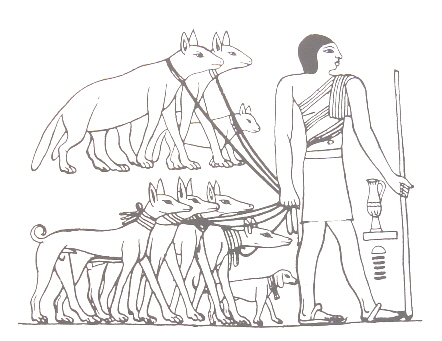
Tesem, an ancient Egyptian sight-hound

In 2017, a study showed that 9,000 years ago the domestic dog lived on Zhokhov Island, arctic north-eastern Siberia, which was connected to the mainland at that time. The dogs were selectively bred as either sled dogs or as hunting dogs, which implies that a sled dog standard and a hunting dog standard existed at that time. The optimal maximum size for a sled dog is 20–25 kg (44–55 lb) based on thermo-regulation, and the ancient sled dogs were between 16–25 kg (35–55 lb). The same standard has been found in the remains of sled dogs from this region 2,000 years ago and in the modern Siberian Husky breed standard. Other dogs were larger at 30 kg (66 lb) and appear to be dogs that had been crossed with wolves and used for polar-bear hunting.

Between 3,000 and 4,000 years ago greyhound-types of dogs were depicted on pottery and paintings in Egypt and Western Asia. Mastiff-type dogs were kept for guarding and hunting, and short-legged dogs were also bred. Most modern dog breeds are the products of the controlled breeding practices of the Victorian era (1830–1900), and the accurate documenting of pedigrees with the establishment of the English Kennel Club in 1873 in imitation of other stud book registries for cattle and horses.

== Genetic evidence ==
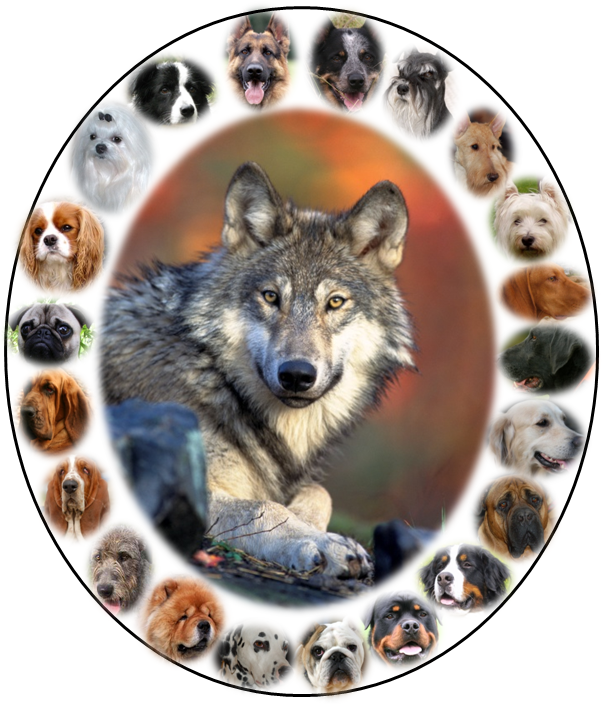
Dogs share a recent common ancestor with modern wolves

The domestic dog is the first species, and the only large carnivore, to have been domesticated. The first dogs were certainly wolflike, but the phenotypic changes that coincided with the dog–wolf genetic divergence are not known. Dogs are the most variable mammal on earth with around 450 globally recognized dog breeds. In the Victorian era, directed human selection developed the modern dog breeds, which resulted in a vast range of phenotypes. Most breeds were derived from small numbers of founders within the last 200 years, and since then dogs have undergone rapid phenotypic change and were formed into today's modern breeds due to artificial selection imposed by humans.

These breeds can vary in size and weight from a 0.46 kg (1.0 lb) teacup poodle to a 90 kg (200 lb) giant mastiff. The skull, body, and limb proportions vary significantly between breeds, with dogs displaying more phenotypic diversity than can be found within the entire order of carnivores. These breeds possess distinct traits related to morphology, which include body size, skull shape, tail phenotype, fur type and colour. The difference in size has been attributed to a lncRNA variant in the IGF1 region arisen in wolves from northern latitudes c. 53.000 years ago and fixed by natural and subsequently by human selection. Their behavioral traits include guarding, herding, and hunting, retrieving, and scent detection. Their personality traits include hypersocial behavior, boldness, and aggression, which demonstrates the functional and behavioral diversity of dogs. As a result, today dogs are the most abundant carnivore species and are dispersed around the world. The most striking example of this dispersal is that of the numerous modern breeds of European lineage during the Victorian era.

A genetic study identified 51 regions of the dog genome which were associated with phenotype variation among breeds in the 57 traits studied, which included body, cranial, dental, and long bone shape and size. There were three quantitative trait loci that explained most of the phenotype variation. Indicators of recent selection were shown by many of the 51 genomic regions that were associated with traits that define a breed, which include body size, coat characteristics, and ear floppiness.

- Wolf
- - - Shar Pei
    - - Shiba Inu
      - - Chow Chow
        - Akita Inu
  - - Basenji
    - - - Siberian Husky
        - Alaskan Malamute
      - - - Afghan Hound
          - Saluki
        - other breeds in the study

Cladogram of nine breeds that are genetically divergent from others

=== Ancient dog breeds ===
"Ancient breed" is a term formerly, but no longer used for a particular group of dog breeds by the American Kennel Club. These breeds were referred to as "ancient", as opposed to modern, breeds because historically it was believed their origins dated back more than 500 years.

In 2004, a study looked at the microsatellites of 414 purebred dogs representing 85 breeds. The study found that dog breeds were so genetically distinct that 99% of individual dogs could be correctly assigned to their breed based on their genotype, indicating that breeding barriers (purebred breeding) have led to distinct genetic units. The study identified 9 breeds that could be represented on the branches of a phylogenetic tree which grouped together with strong statistical support and could be separated from the other breeds with a modern European origin. These 9 breeds had been referred to as "ancient breeds". The study found that the Pharaoh Hound and Ibizan Hound were not as old as once believed; rather, they had been recreated from combinations of other breeds, and that the Norwegian Elkhound grouped with the other European dogs despite reports of direct Scandinavian origins dating back 5,000 years.

=== Dog types ===
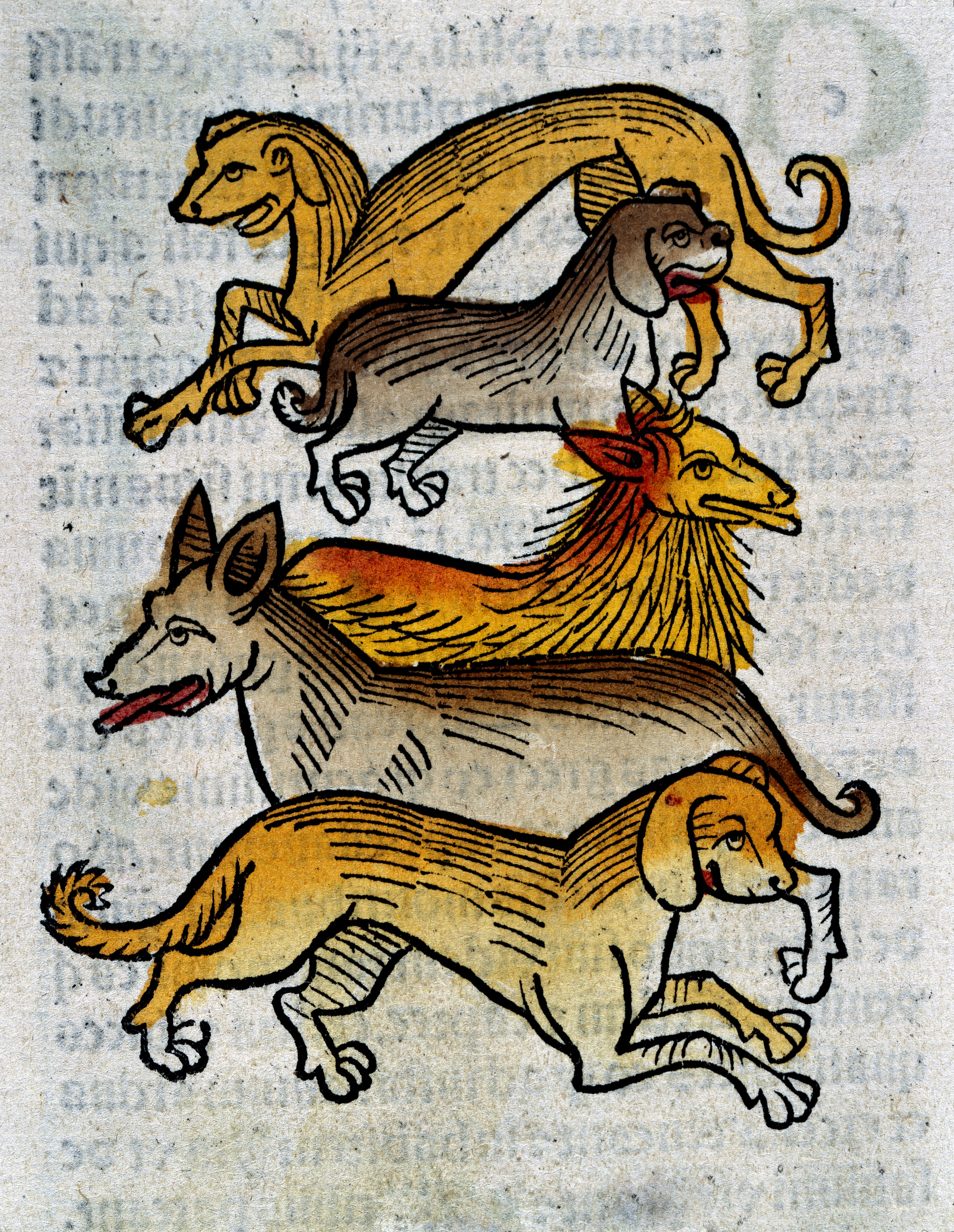
"Five different types of dogs", c. 1547.

Dog types are broad categories of dogs based on form, function or style of work, lineage, or appearance. In contrast, modern dog breeds are particular breed standards, sharing a common set of heritable characteristics, determined by the kennel club that recognizes the breed.

The spread of modern dog breeds has been difficult to resolve because many are the product of the controlled breeding practices of the Victorian era (1830–1900). In 2010, a study looked at 48,000 single nucleotide polymorphisms that gave a genome-wide coverage of 912 dogs representing 85 breeds.

The study found distinct genetic clusters within modern dogs that largely corresponded to phenotype or function. These included spitz-breeds, toy dogs, spaniels, Mastiff-like breeds, small terriers, retrievers, herding dogs, scent-hounds, and sight-hounds. There were 17 breeds that conflicted with phenotype or function and these were thought to be the result of crossing some of the other phenotypes. As in a 2004 study that found 9 'ancient breeds' to be genetically divergent, the study found 13 breeds that were genetically divergent from the modern breeds: the Basenji, Saluki, Afghan Hound, Samoyed, Canaan dog, New Guinea singing dog, dingo, Chow Chow, Chinese Shar Pei, Akita, Alaskan Malamute, Siberian Husky and American Eskimo Dog.

The study found that there were three well-supported groups that were highly divergent and distinct from modern domestic dogs.

- an Asian group (Dingo, New Guinea singing dog, Chow Chow, Akita and Shar Pei)
- a Middle Eastern group (Afghan Hound and Saluki)
- a northern group (Alaskan Malamute and Siberian Husky).

The earliest books in the English language to mention numbers of dog types are from the "Cynegetica" (hunting literature), namely, The Art of Venery (1327) by Twiti (Twici), a treatise that describes hunting with the limer (a leashed bloodhound type); the pack of running hounds, which included barcelets and brachetz (both scent hounds); and the sighthound and greyhound. More significant in recording the use and description of various dog types is The Master of Game (circa 1406) by Edward of York, a treatise that describes dogs and their work, such as the alaunt, greyhound, pack scent hounds, spaniel, and mastiff, used by the privileged and wealthy for hunting purposes. The Master of Game is a combination of the earlier Art of Venery and the French hunting treatise Livre de Chasse by Gaston Phoebus (circa 1387). The Book of Saint Albans, published in 1486, a "school" book about hawking, hunting, fishing, and heraldry, attributed to Juliana Berners (Barnes), lists dogs of the time mainly by function: "First there is a greyhound, a bastard, a mongrel, a mastiff, a limer, a spaniel, "raches" (small-to-medium-sized scenthounds), "kennets" (small hunting dogs), terriers, "butcher's hounds", dung-heap dogs, "trundel tails" (lapdogs?) and prick-eared curs, and small ladies puppies that bear away the fleas and diverse small sorts."

=== Basal breeds ===
A study in 2012 examined 49,000 single nucleotide polymorphisms that gave a genome-wide coverage of 1,375 dogs representing 35 breeds, 19 wolves, and previous published genetic signatures of other breeds, giving a total of 121 breeds covered. The study found a deep genetic split between old-world and new-world wolves, and confirmed the genetic divergence of 13 breeds from a 2010 study (Afghan Hound, Akita, Alaskan Malamute, American Eskimo, Basenji, Canaan dog, Chow Chow, Dingo, New Guinea singing dog, Saluki, Samoyed, Shar-Pei, Siberian Husky), plus another three: the Eurasier, Finnish Spitz and Shiba Inu. The study referred to these 16 as basal breeds, as opposed to ancient breeds, as they exhibited genetic divergence but not all of them were historically considered to be "ancient breeds".

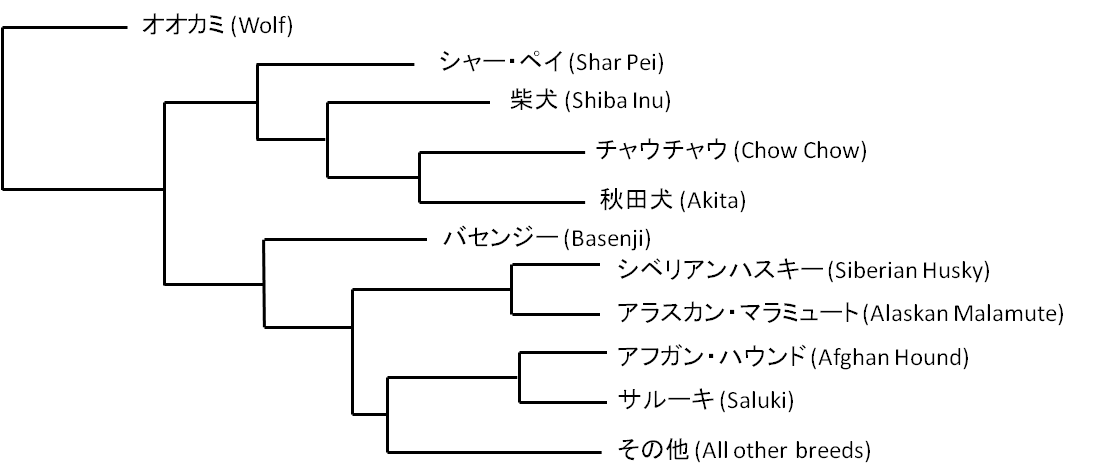
Phylogenetic tree of ancient dog breeds

The 2012 study found that modern breeds only emerged in the 19th century and that claims of their antiquity are based on little or no historical or empirical evidence. The study indicated that throughout history, global dog populations experienced numerous episodes of diversification and homogenization, with each round further reducing the power of genetic data derived from modern breeds to help infer their early history.

Of the basal breeds, the American Eskimo Dog and Eurasier were the very recent product of cross-breeding other basal breeds. Most basal breeds have hybridized with other lineages in the past. If those other lineages were other basal breeds then a basal genetic signature remains. The combination of introgression and past population bottlenecks suggested that basal breeds have little or no genetic connections to their ancestral populations and that their genetic distinctiveness does not signify ancient heritage. They are distinctive from the modern breeds because the genetic heritage of the modern breeds has become blurred due to admixture, and the basal breeds have mostly avoided admixture with them due to geographic or cultural barriers.

=== Medical research ===
As dogs are a subspecies but their breeds are distinct genetic units, and because only certain breeds share the same type of cancers as humans, the differences in the genes of different breeds may be useful in human medical research.

=== Breed temperament ===
In 2014, a study indicated that some breed-temperaments, such as anxiety or fear, may be linked to gene mutations. Other temperaments may be due to the legacies of 'ancient' ancestry.

== Breeds ==
=== Pure breeds ===
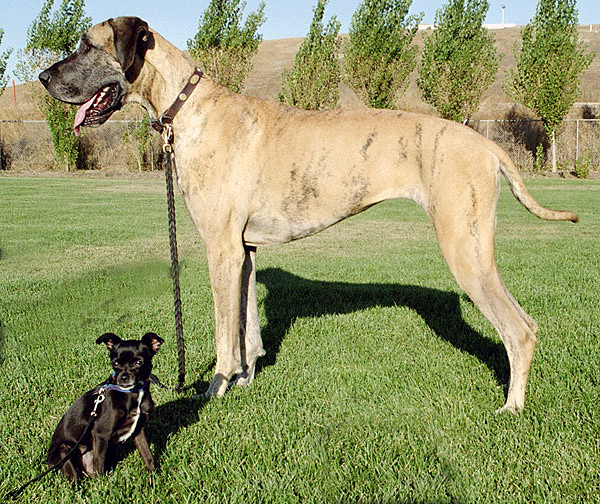
Chihuahua mix and purebred Great Dane

==== Kennel clubs ====
Groups of owners that have dogs of the same breed and have an interest in dog breeding can form national Kennel clubs. Kennel Clubs maintain breed standards, record pedigrees in a breed registry (or studbook), and issue the rules for conformation dog shows and trials and accreditation of judges. They often serve as registries, which are lists of adult purebred dogs and lists of litters of puppies born to purebred parents.

A dog breed is represented by a sufficient number of individuals to stably transfer its specific characteristics over generations. Dogs of same breed have similar characteristics of appearance and behavior, primarily because they come from a select set of ancestors who had the same characteristics. Dogs of a specific breed breed true, producing young that are very similar to their parents. An individual dog is identified as a member of a breed through proof of ancestry, using genetic analysis or written records of ancestry. Without such proof, identification of a specific breed is not reliable. Such records, called stud books, may be maintained by individuals, clubs, or other organizations.

Kennel clubs provide the recognition of distinct dog breeds, but there are many independent clubs with differing, and sometimes inconsistent standards and they need not apply scientific standards. Four varieties of the Belgian Shepherd Dog are recognised as four distinct breeds by the New Zealand Kennel Club. Further, some groups of dogs which clearly share a persistent set of characteristics and documented descent from a known foundation stock may still not be recognized by some clubs as breeds. For instance, the feist is a hunting dog raised in the Southern United States for hunting small game. Feists have a consistent set of characteristics that reliably differentiate them from other dog types and breeds. However, the United Kennel Club recognizes one breed of feist, the Treeing Feist, while the American Kennel Club does not recognize any feist breed.

A dog is said to be purebred if their parents were purebred and if the dog meets the standards of the breed. The American Kennel Club allows mixed-breed dogs to be shown but under the condition the animals have been spayed or neutered, are not a wolf hybrid, and not eligible for the AKC Foundation Stock Service Program or an AKC Purebred Alternative Listing (PAL).

In Canada, the Animal Pedigree Act lays out strict standards for the documenting of what it calls "evolving breeds".

==== Breed standards ====
The breed standard for each breed of dog is a detailed description of the appearance and behaviour of an idealized dog of that breed. Included in the breed standard description are externally observable aspects of appearance and behaviour that are considered by the breed club to be the most important for the breed, and externally observable details of appearance or temperament that are considered by the breed club to be unacceptable (called faults). In addition, most breed standards include a historical section, describing the place of origin and the original work done by the breed or its ancestor types.

==== Major registries ====
Dogs with a breed standard may be accepted into one or more of the major registries (kennel clubs) of dog breeds, including The Kennel Club (1873, UK), American Kennel Club (1884), New Zealand Kennel Club (1886), Canadian Kennel Club (1888), United Kennel Club (1898), United Kennel Clubs International (UCI, Germany 1976), Australian National Kennel Council (1958), and other national breed registries. Recognized dog breeds are classified by groups, such as Hound, Terrier, Working, Herding, Sporting, Non-Sporting, Toy and Miscellaneous; some groups may be further subdivided by some registries. Some breeds are managed by independent organizations, e.g. border collies by the International Sheep Dog Society (ISDS).

Fédération Cynologique Internationale (FCI) is neither a breed registry nor does it issue pedigrees or keep addresses for breeders. It is a global canine organization with member and contract partners (one member per country) that conduct international conformation shows, working/hunting/herding trials, and various other events. The results are submitted to FCI for processing, approval and international recognition. Each of the member and contract partners issue and maintain their own pedigrees and respective breed standards, and train their own judges. FCI ensures that each member mutually recognizes the pedigrees and judges of all FCI members.

==== Health issues ====
Purebred dogs have more health problems than mongrel dogs, and require more veterinary visits, and tend to have lower longevity. Indeed, studies have reported lifespans that are shorter by between one and almost two years. Notably, dog breeds with flat faces and short noses have breathing difficulties, eye trouble and other health issues.

==== List of pure breeds ====
Refer: List of dog breeds

The Fédération Cynologique Internationale is a global organisation with 98 members and contract partners (one member per country) that recognize 356 purebreds.

=== Cross-breeds ===
A dog crossbreed is the result of mating two different breeds. "Designer Dog" became a fad in the late 20th century. Dog crossbreeds are combinations of lineages of the domestic dog; they are distinguished from canid hybrids, which are interspecific crosses between Canis species (wolves, coyotes, jackals, etc.). Notable canid hybrids include the coydog, coywolf, dingo–dog hybrid, jackal–dog hybrid, and wolfdog.

Historically, crosses between dogs of different types were more well accepted at a time when modern purebred breeds (based on the eugenics principles) did not yet exist. Some crossbred dogs, created by breeding two purebred dogs of different breeds, may have the advantage of heterosis, or crossbreed vigor. This advantage can be progressively diluted when two crossbreeds are bred in the attempt to create a breed, narrowing the gene pool. The best way to continue taking advantage of crossbreed vigor is from the breeding of dogs of purebred ancestry, as this vigor is typically seen only in the first generation cross of two purebred animals of separate breeds, thus taking advantage of genetic diversity.

=== Mixed-breeds ===
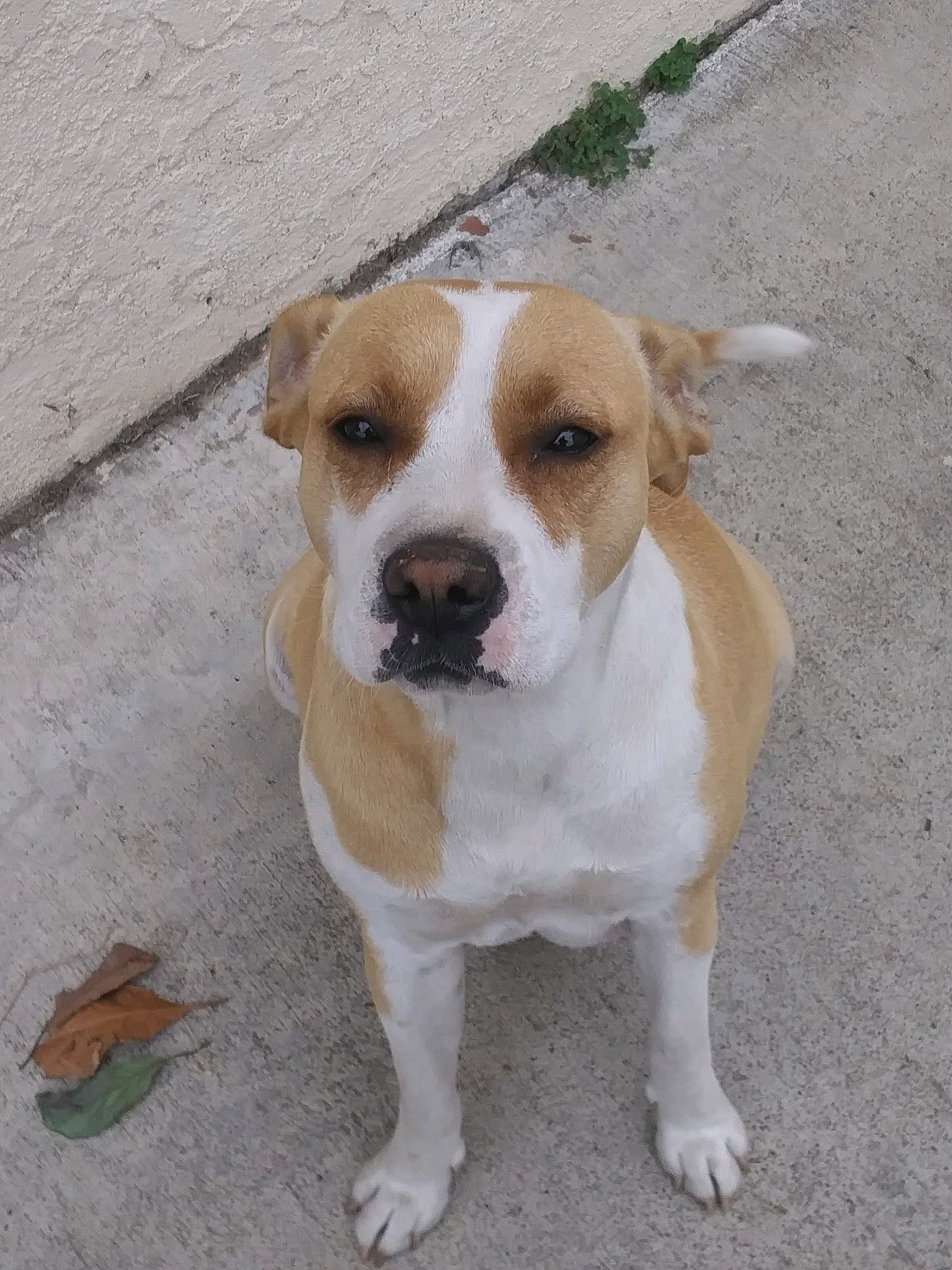
Boxer and Labrador Mix

A mongrel, mixed-breed dog or mutt is a dog that does not belong to one officially recognized breed but can be a mix of two breeds and is not the result of intentional breeding. British author Jilly Cooper wrote a book titled Intelligent and Loyal to entirely focus on mongrels.

In the United States, the term mixed-breed is a favored synonym over mongrel among individuals who wish to avoid negative connotations associated with the latter term. The implication that such dogs must be a mix of defined breeds may stem from an inverted understanding of the origins of dog breeds. Purebred dogs have been, for the most part, artificially created from random-bred populations by human selective breeding with the purpose of enhancing desired physical, behavioral, or temperamental characteristics. Dogs that are not purebred are not necessarily a mix of such defined breeds. Therefore, among some experts and fans of such dogs, mongrel is still the preferred term.

=== Natural breeds ===
See further: Landraces

Natural breeds rose through time in response to a particular environment and in isolation from other populations of the species. This environment included humans but with little or no selective breeding by humans.

== See also ==
- List of dog breeds
- Hypertype
