= Venery =

Venery may refer to:

- Venery (hunting) or medieval hunting
- Terms of venery or collective nouns
