= Hart (deer) =

Medieval hunting term for a red deer stag more than five years old

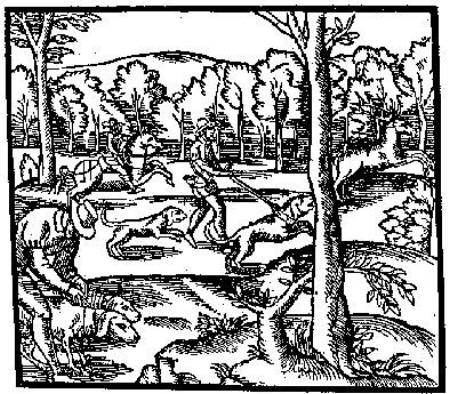
"Hunting the Hart", a picture from George Turberville, copied from La Venerie de Jaques du Fouilloux, 16th century

A hart is a male red deer, synonymous with stag and used in contrast to the female hind; its use may now be considered mostly poetic or archaic, although for example it remains in use in the name of inns and pubs. The word comes from Middle English hert, from Old English heorot; compare Frisian hart, Dutch hert, German Hirsch, and Swedish, Norwegian, and Danish hjort, all meaning "deer". Heorot is given as the name of Hrothgar's mead hall in the Old English epic Beowulf.

Historically, hart has also been used generically to mean "deer, antelope", as in the royal antelope, which Willem Bosman called "the king of the harts". The word hart was also sometimes used in the past specifically to describe a stag of more than five years.

== In deer classification ==
In medieval hunting terms, a stag in its first year was called a "calf" or "calfe", in its second a "brocket", in its third a "spayed", "spade", or "spayard", in its fourth a "staggerd" or "staggard", and in its fifth a "stag", or a "great stag". To be a "hart" was its fully mature state. A lord would want to hunt not just any deer, but a mature stag in good condition, not only for the extra meat and fat it would carry, but also for prestige. Hence, a hart could be designated "a hart of grease", (a fat stag), "a hart of ten", (a stag with 10 points on its antlers) or "a royal hart" (a stag which had been hunted by a royal personage). A stag which was old enough to be hunted was called a "warrantable" stag.

The hart was a beast of venery representing the most prestigious form of hunting, as distinct from lesser beasts of the Chase and beasts of the free warren, the last of which were regarded virtually as vermin. The membership of these different classes varies somewhat across periods and writers, but the red deer is always in the first class, the red fox hardly being regarded at all. Like the fallow deer buck and the wild boar, the hart was normally sought out or "harboured" by a "limer", or Bloodhound hunting on a leash, which would track it from its droppings or footprints to where it was browsing. The huntsman would then report back to his lord and the hunting party would come bringing a pack of raches. These scent hounds would "unharbour" the hart and chase it on its hot scent until it was brought to bay.

== Persistence of the term ==
The word hart is not now widely used, but its traces persist.

Shakespeare makes several references (for example in Twelfth Night), punning on the homophones "hart" and "heart". The word is used several times in The Hobbit by J. R. R. Tolkien, when Bilbo Baggins and company pass through Mirkwood Forest. It is alluded to in the Joss Whedon series Angel: the senior partners of law firm Wolfram & Hart are represented, respectively by the wolf, the ram and the hart. It is mentioned in the first of the series of novels by George R. R. Martin Game of Thrones when a "white hart" is sighted in the woods: King Robert Baratheon and other lords seek to hunt the creature (perhaps an allusion to Robert himself becoming something of a white or ghost stag). The "White Hart", a personal emblem of Richard II, and "The Red Hart" remain common English pub names. Arthur C. Clarke's Tales from the White Hart is set at one such pub. In 2020, there were 233 White Hart pubs, the sixth most popular pub name in Britain.

The surnames Hart and Hartley ("wood of the hart") also derive from the animal, as do the variant spellings Harte and Hurt.

Several places in Great Britain and the United States are named Hart, including the district of Hart in Hampshire, the villages of Hartfield at the edge of Ashdown Forest in East Sussex and Hart Common on the outskirts of Westhoughton in Greater Manchester, and the town of Hartlepool and the nearby village of Hart, in County Durham. Whinfell Forest once contained a landmark tree called the Harthorn.

Hartford (from hart + ford) is the name of many places in the United States and England, including the city of Hartford, Connecticut and various entities located there. Hartford is an English surname of considerable antiquity.

Heorot, Herut, and Hert are Old English spellings of hart; thus Heorot, a royal hall in Beowulf, is named for the hart, as is Hertford and Hertfordshire in England (which in turn lent the name to Hartford, Connecticut).

A hart appears in the first line of Psalm 42 in the King James Version (1604–1611): "As the hart panteth after the water brooks, so panteth my soul after thee, O God." Tate and Brady's (1696) metrical psalms, among others, also use this figure: "As pants the hart for cooling streams" for its common meter (CM) rendering of the Psalm 42 text.

== See also ==
- Hart in medieval hunting
- Hartshorn
