= Naometria =

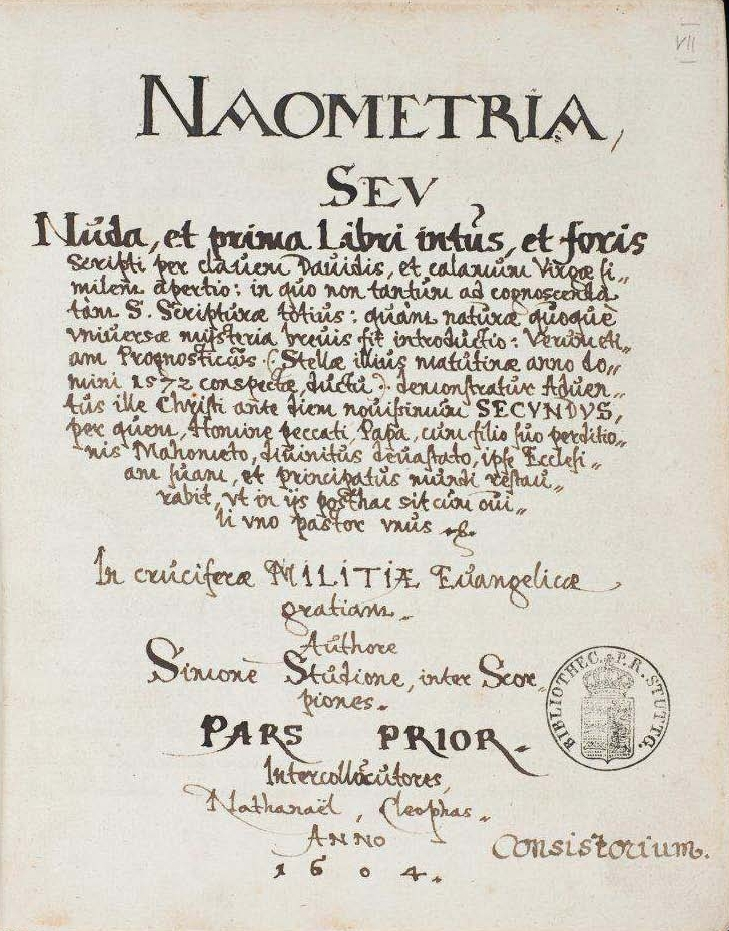
Title page

Naometria ("temple measurement") is a book of prophecies attributed to Simon Studion and published in 1604. Its two thousand pages cover predictions based on numerology that include destruction of the Papacy. It was dedicated to Frederick I, Duke of Württemberg.

Its appearance in Tübingen drew enough interest that a "Society Naometrica" was formed, which included Bible and cabala scholar Tobias Hess and Lutheran theologian Johann Valentin Andreä.

It is addressed in the 1983 volume of Hermetic Journal.
