= James Sandford (translator) =

English author and translator

James Sandford or Sanford (fl. 1567) was an English author, known as a translator of Epictetus and Cornelius Agrippa. According to Sidney Lee in the Dictionary of National Biography, he may have been a native of Somerset, and uncle or cousin to John Sandford.

== Works ==
In 1567 he published two translations with Henry Bynneman, the London printer, from Plutarch, dedicated to Sir Hugh Paulet of Hinton St. George, Somerset, and another of Epictetus, dedicated to Elizabeth I of England. Two years later there followed Henrie Cornelius Agrippa, of the Vanitie and Uncertaintie of Artes and Sciences, englished by Ja. San., Gent., London, 1569 (by Henry Wykes); it was dedicated to Thomas Howard, 4th Duke of Norfolk; a few verses are included. In 1573 there appeared The Garden of Pleasure, contayninge most pleasante tales, worthy deeds, and witty sayings of noble princes and learned philosophers moralized, done out of Italian into English, London (by H. Bynneman), 1573; this was dedicated to Robert Dudley, 1st Earl of Leicester. In an appendix are Italian proverbs. The work was reissued; in the dedication to Sir Christopher Hatton, Sandford repeats some prognostications of disaster for 1588. An appendix collects poems dedicated to the queen. Mirror of Madnes, translated from the French, or a Paradoxe, maintayning madnes to be most excellent, done out of French into English by Ja. San. Gent. London (Tho. Marshe), was also published in 1576; it resembles Erasmus's Praise of Folly. A few verses are included.

Sandford was further responsible for The Revelation of S. Iohn, reveled as a paraphrase . . . written in Latine (by James Brocard), London (by Thomas Marshe), 1582; it was dedicated to Robert Dudley, Earl of Leicester (British Museum). Some verses by Sandford are prefixed to George Turberville's Plaine Path to Perfect Vertue (1568).

== Notes ==
Attribution

This article incorporates text from a publication now in the public domain: "Sandford, James". Dictionary of National Biography. London: Smith, Elder & Co. 1885–1900.
