= Sleuth hound =

Ancient breed of dog

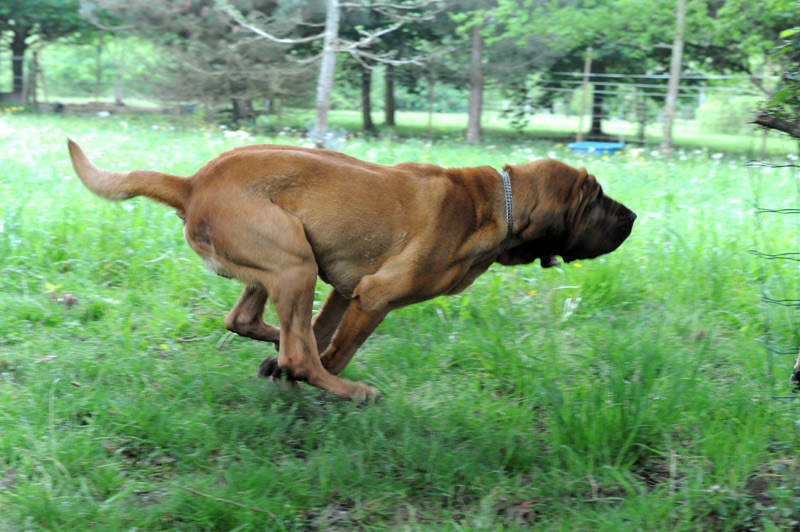
A modern Bloodhound running

The sleuth hound (/ˈsluːθhaʊnd/, from Old Norse slóð "track, trail" + hound) was a breed of dog. Broadly, it was a Scottish term for what in England was called the Bloodhound, although it seems that there were slight differences between them. It was also referred to as a 'slough dog', (or 'slewe dogge'), and a 'slow hound', the first word likely representing a mispronunciation of 'slough' rather than a reference to the speed of the hound.

The sleuth hound first appears in poems about the Scottish patriots Robert the Bruce and William Wallace. These poems depict their heroes tracked by sleuth hounds. Bruce escapes by crossing water, and Wallace by killing one of his party, whom he suspects of treachery, and leaving the corpse to distract the hound. The poems are romances, not histories, but there is no implausibility about the use of sleuth hounds. John Barbour, who wrote The Bruce, was born before his hero died, and the year in which the Bruce was supposedly pursued was 1307. Thus, the inclusion of the sleuth hound in the story was no anachronism, hence that the dogs existed in Scotland as early as c. 1300, and that their use as man-trailers was fully established.

The earliest description of the sleuth hound is in The history and croniklis of Scotland 1536, a translation by John Bellenden of a Latin text by Hector Boece, Historia Gentis Scotorum (History of the Scottish People), originally published in 1526. The sleuth hound is described as one of three kinds of dog unique to Scotland. It is said to be red or black with small spots. Its special quality is its marvelous scenting power and determination in pursuing thieves (known as Border Reivers). The law of the borders between Scotland and England required that he who denies entry to the sleuth hound when in pursuit of stolen goods is held as an accomplice to the theft.

John Caius (translated from Latin by Fleming 1576) describes very similar uses of the English bloodhound on the borders, leading us to think that the Bloodhound and sleuth hound were the same animal. In a book published in Switzerland in 1554 the sleuth hound is also called 'blüthund' and 'canis Scoticus furum deprehensor' ('Scottish dog, thief catcher'). It is confirmed here and in other texts of the time that the two animals were the same, except that the Bloodhound was somewhat larger, and had a greater variety of coat colours than the sleuth hound. Generally, references to the sleuth hound appear in a man-trailing context, whereas the Bloodhound may appear either as a man-trailer or as a seeker of beasts in the hunting field.

Likely from around 1700, any differences between the two types disappeared. "Bloodhound" becomes the usual term even in Scottish sources, such as Sir Walter Scott. The Scottish term survives in its metaphorical use from the early 19th century as a detective, now usually shortened to sleuth.

== Boece's account ==
OF THE MERUELLUS NATURE OF SYNDRY SCOTTIS DOGGIS

In Scotland ar doggis of meruellous nature, For abone the commoun nature and condition of doggis, quhilkis ar sene in al partis, ar thre maner of doggis in Scotland, quhilk ar sene in na vthir partis of the warld.... The thrid kynd is mair than ony rache*, Reid hewit or ellis blak with small spraingis of spottis, and ar callit be the peple sleuthoundis. Thir doggis hes sa meruellus wit, that yai serche theuis and followis on thaym allanerlie be sent of the guddis that ar tane away. And nocht allanerlie fyndis the theif, but inuadis hym with gret cruelte. And youcht the theuis oftymes cors the watter, quair they pas, to cause ye hound to tyne the sent of thaym and the guudis, yit he serchis heir and thair with sic diligence, that be his fut he fyndis baith the trace of the theif and the guddis. The meruellous nature of yir houndis wil have na faith with vncouth peple. Howbeit the samyn ar rycht frequent and ryfe on the bordouris of Ingland and Scotland. Attour it is statute be the lawis of the bordouris, he that denyis entres to the sleuthound in tyme of chace and serching of guddis, salbe haldin participant with the cryme and thift committit.

Rendered into modern English:

In Scotland there are dogs of a marvellous nature, for above the common nature and condition of dogs which are seen in all places, there are three sorts of dogs in Scotland which are seen in no other parts of the world... The third kind is larger than any pack-hound, red coloured or else black with small streaks of spots, and they are called sleuth-hounds by the people. These dogs have such a marvellous cleverness that they seek for thieves, and follow them only by the scent of the goods that are taken away. And not only find the thief but attack him with great cruelty. And though the thieves often cross the water, where they pass to make the hound lose the scent of them and the goods, yet he searches here and there with such diligence that by his foot (ie by the foot-scent of the thief) he finds both the trace of the thief and his goods. The marvellous nature of these hounds will not be believed by ignorant people. Nevertheless, the same hounds are very frequent and common on the borders of England and Scotland. In addition it is established by the laws of the border that he that denies entry to the sleuth-hound on an occasion of pursuit and searching for goods shall be held as an accomplice to the crime and theft committed.

- Bellenden's translation says that the sleuth hound is larger than a rache (pack hound); Boece's Latin original says it is not larger. Whether this is an error by Bellenden, or a deliberate correction, is uncertain.
