= Limer =

Medieval scenthound

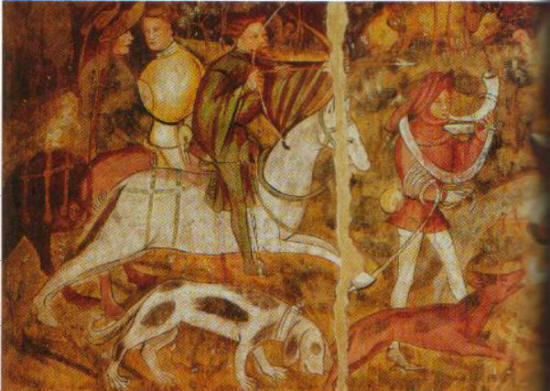
Medieval huntsmen, showing a limer and its handler

A limer, or lymer /ˈlaɪmər/, was a kind of dog, a scenthound, used on a leash in medieval times to find large game before it was hunted down by the pack. It was sometimes known as a lyam hound/dog or lime-hound, from the Middle English word lyam, meaning 'leash'. The French cognate limier has sometimes been used for the dogs in English as well. The type is not to be confused with the bandog, which was also a dog controlled by a leash, typically a chain, but was a watchdog or guard dog.

== Use ==
In medieval hunting in France and England, certain kinds of game were not found and hunted with a full pack, as usual in modern hunting. Instead, they were first found by a limer.

The limer would be taken out at dawn by its handler, on foot, who would identify, perhaps from droppings, perhaps from footprints, where a large animal had passed during the night. He would set his hound on the trail, until it had found where the animal was browsing or at rest. This required keen scenting, the ability to ignore all other scents that might be a distraction, and silent trailing. This process became known as 'harbouring' the animal.

Several limers might be sent out to different parts of the forest. The handlers would then report back to their lord, or the chief huntsman, who would decide on the one "which seemed to have harbored the greatest and oldest Deere, and hym which lyeth in the fairest covert". Then the huntsmen would bring the pack of scent hounds, known as 'raches', or 'running hounds'. Raches might be set in relays along the path where the quarry could be expected to run, held in couples, to be released on the huntsman's signal. The game animal would be put to flight or 'unharboured' and the pack would follow it on its hot scent until it was brought to bay and killed.

If the quarry escaped the pack, perhaps wounded, or if the hunt was overtaken by nightfall, the huntsmen would mark the point where the quarry was last known to have been, and the lords and ladies of the hunt would return to the hunting lodge, or to the pavilions which had been erected for them in the forest, to sleep or occupy themselves with feasting. The limer and its handler would then set about the task of harbouring the quarry again, perhaps by following its blood-trail, and either the injured animal would be dispatched, or the hunt would resume as before.

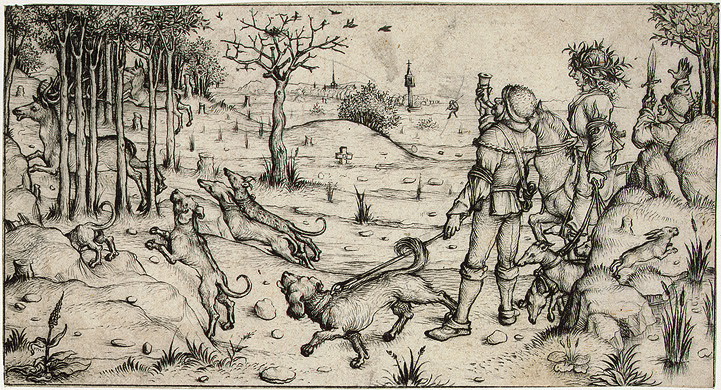
A picture of a Dutch hunting party showing a rough-haired limer

The limer was a specialist tracker, probably outnumbered by raches in a lord's pack, in about the proportions 20:1, and it was highly valued. It is possible that on occasions it might be released to pursue the quarry with the pack, but normally it did not take part in the kill. The limer which had harboured the particular quarry should, according to the manuals, be the first to be rewarded with its special part of the carcass during the process of butchering it, apparent in this link, where the leashed hound is favoured with the head of the stag, while the raches wait impatiently for their share. It had its own special attendant who looked after it and handled it: the 'valet de limier', translated by Turbervile as 'the varlet who keeps the bloodhound'.

To do its work, the limer had to wear a collar, the modern tracking harness surprisingly being unthought of in a period when everyone must have been familiar with the harnesses and tack of horses, and the leash had to be long enough to allow the hound to cast. Edward, Duke of York in The Master of Game 1406–1413 (a translation of Livre de la Chasse) : writes (Chapter XX):

And the length of the hounds' couples between the hounds should be a foot, and the rope of a limer three fathoms and a half, be he ever so wise a limer it sufficeth.

== Kinds of hounds used as limers ==
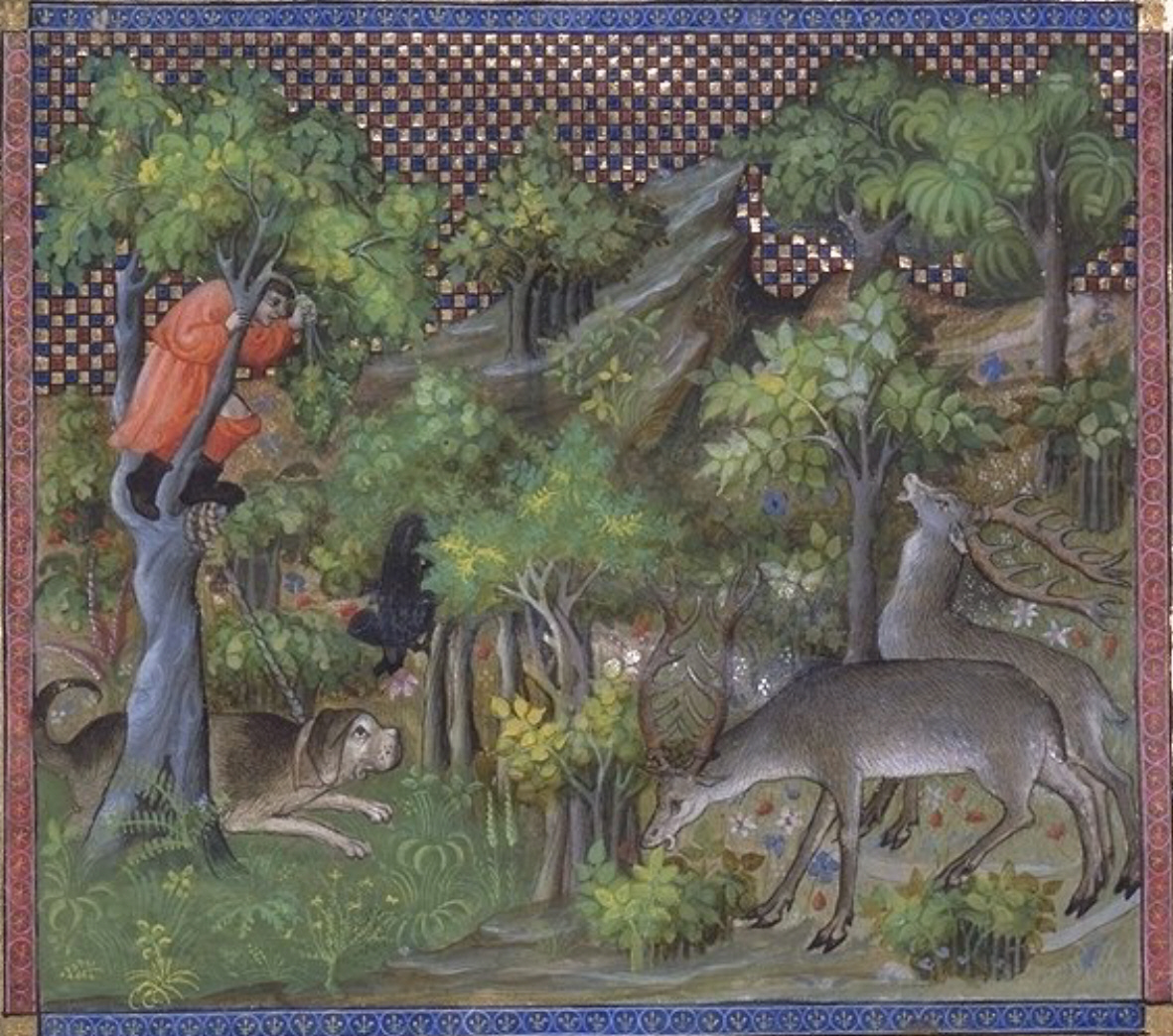
Finding the Hart from the famous medieval manuscript Livre de la Chasse by Gaston Phoebus, Count de Foix. The handler has tied his heavily built limer to a tree, which he has climbed to spot the deer.

Medieval hunting pictures generally show the limer as a hound of similar type to the running hounds, but larger and more heavily built. In England, the Bloodhound was so typically associated with the function of being a limer that George Turberville uses the term "Bloodhound" (in preference to "limer", which was becoming archaic) for the French word "limier" throughout his 1575 translation of La Venerie de Jaques du Fouilloux. For instance, du Fouilloux says limiers of the St. Hubert kind are good, so that when Turberville translates 'limiers' as 'bloodhounds', he is not saying that St. Huberts and Bloodhounds are the same breed, only that they work well as leash hounds.

Though by then this form of hunting was becoming old-fashioned, in Country Contentments, or the Husbandmans Recreations, 1615, Gervase Markham writes:

The blacke hound, the black tann'd or he that is all liver-hew'd or the milke-white which is the true Talbot, are best for the string or lyam, for they do delight most in blood, and have a natural inclination to hunt dry-foot, and of these the largest are ever the best and most comely.

== Changes in hunting practice ==
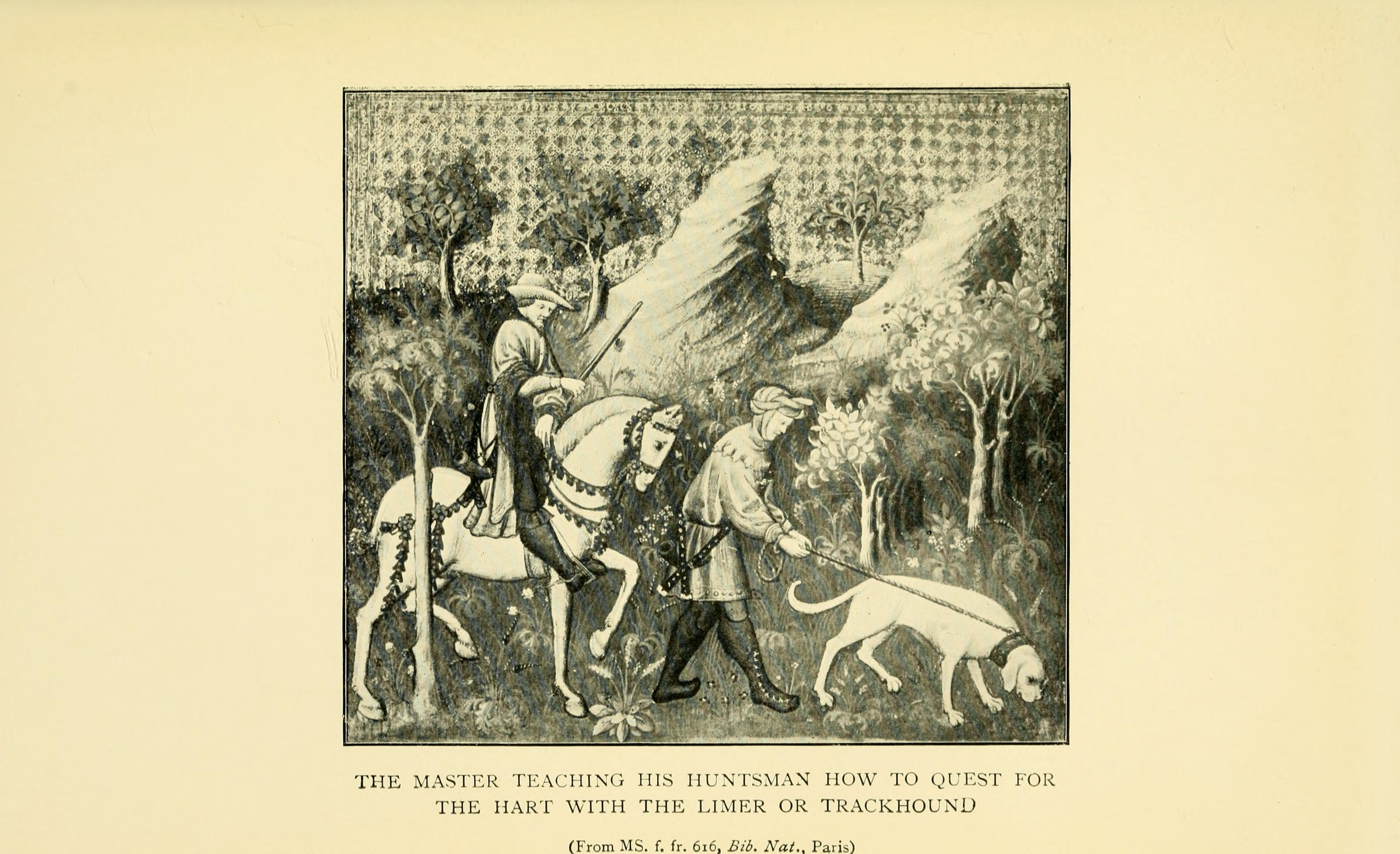
French illustration showing a huntmaster teaching a huntsman how to hunt for hart with the limer.

In Great Britain, the hart, the wild boar and the fallow deer buck were the only animals to be harboured with the limer; all other game was found, as well as hunted, by the free-running raches.

As the wild boar became extinct, and the interest of British huntsmen changed to fox-hunting, the limer lost its usefulness. In France, limiers held by "valets de limiers" are used to follow tracks in the early morning before the hunt starts so as to determine where to set loose the pack.

The word 'limer' is first recorded in surviving texts from the mid-14th century, though the way it is used suggests it was by then a familiar term to the readers. By the late 16th century, as hunting practices were beginning to change, it was becoming rarer, and later usage reflects some confusion about what it refers to, some authors just regarding it as a large mastiff-type dog of impure breeding.

== See also ==
- Deer hunting
- List of dog breeds
- List of extinct dog breeds
