= Simon Studion =

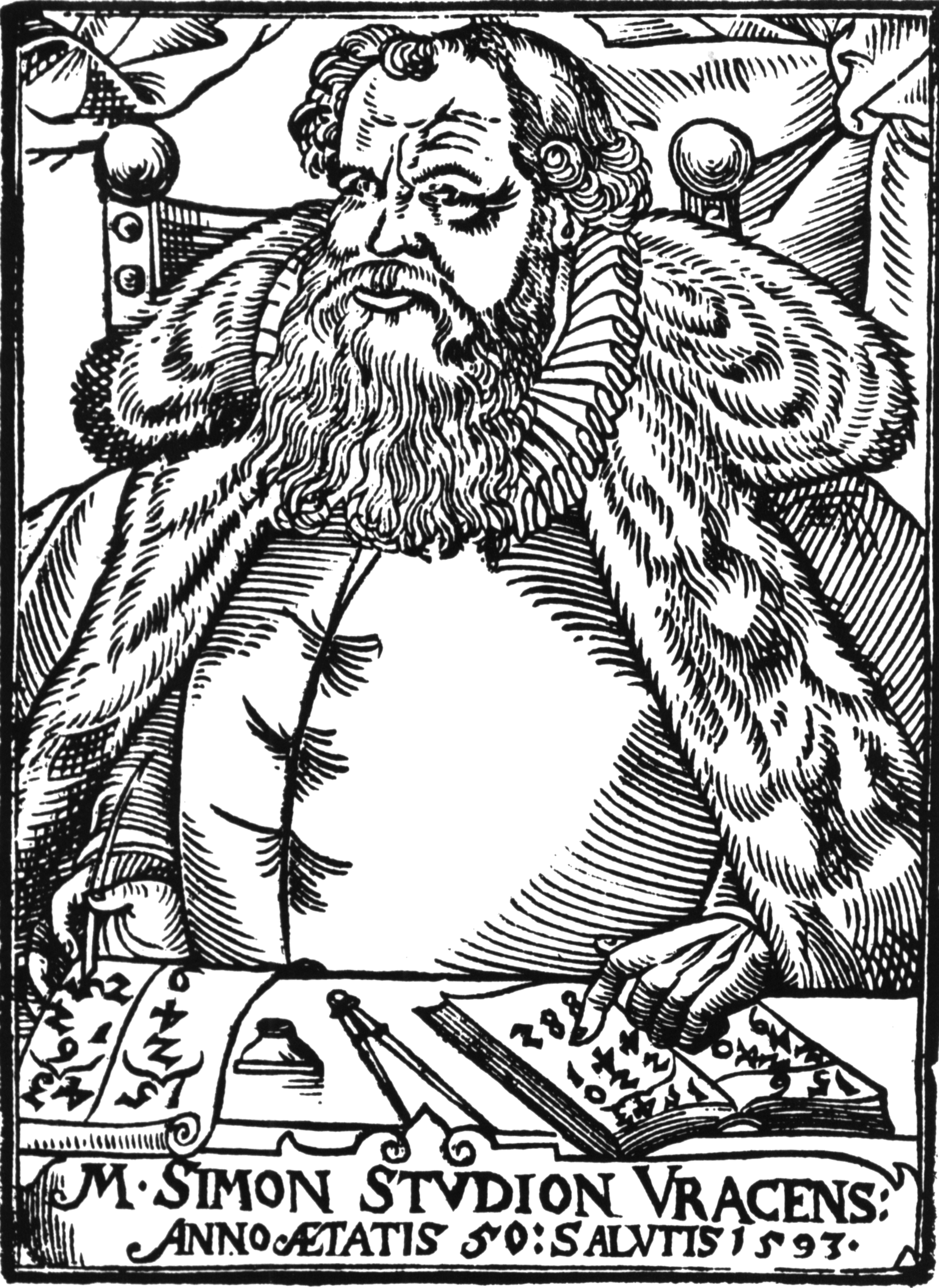

Simon Studion (6 March 1543 – 1605) was a German teacher of Latin, poet, historian, archaeologist, and author of apocryphal literature.

Simon was the son of Jakob Studion, who came from Hesse but settled in Urbach to take on the role as cook for Ulrich, Duke of Württemberg.

He was influential on Tobias Hess. He lived in Württemberg.

In 1597 Tobias Hess corresponded with Simon Studion and agreed with him that the Papacy must fall in 1604.

He wrote Naometria, a book of prophecies published in 1604.
