= Cynegeticus (disambiguation) =

Cynegeticus, Cynegetica or Cynegeticon (Gr. Κυνεγετικά) is the title of several works about hunting, particularly with dogs, from antiquity:

- Cynegeticus by Xenophon (c. 430 – 354 BCE)
- Cynegeticon Liber by Gratius Faliscus, from the Augustan period (63 BCE – 14 CE)
- Cynegeticus by Arrian (c. 86 – 160 CE)
- Cynegeticus by Oppian of Anazarbus, from the 2nd century CE
- Cynegeticus by Oppian of Apamea, dated after 211 CE
- Cynegetica by Marcus Aurelius Olympius Nemesianus (283/284 CE)
