= Guicennas =

Start of De arte bersandi in the Chantilly manuscript

Guicennas was a German knight and falconer in the service the Emperor Frederick II (r. 1220–1250). The anonymous north Italian author of a Latin treatise on hunting deer with bows, De arte bersandi, cites Guicennas as his source. So indebted to him are its contents that the text's incipit (words marking the start) and explicit (words marking the end) describe it as his work: liber Guicennatis, book of Guicennas. It is the earliest hunting treatise in Western literature.

== Life ==
In the introduction of De arte bersandi, Guicennas is described as a German knight (miles Teotonicus), lord (dominus) and "master in every kind of hunting by the testimony of the hunters of Lord Frederick, emperor of the Romans". Reference to the testimony of the barons and princes of Germany suggests that he was employed by them as well. The wording of the introduction indicates that he was dead when it was written, but the author or compiler probably knew him personally. He probably developed the techniques in the treatise while in Italy.

The exact relationship of Guicennas to the treatise which bears his name is a matter of disagreement. Kurt Lindner regards him as the author, while Tilander considers him only the "inspirer". His name is sometimes spelled Guicennans and Guicenas. Hermann Werth identified him with Avicenna but without providing an argument. Sander Govaerts suggests that he may be the same person as Konrad von Lützelhard.

== De arte bersandi ==
=== Content ===
The title of De arte bersandi refers to a type of hunting know as bersatio, which means "the art of hunting stags by surrounding the unsuspecting victims with archers". Guicennas's treatise begins by listing the six skills required of the hunter in bersatio: the use and maintenance of a crossbow, the training of a staghound, how to use the wind to one's advantage, the use of a hunting horn, how to deliver the coup de grâce and how to skin and butcher the animal. The body of the treatise covers the training of hounds and the equipment and techniques of the hunt itself. A hunting team consists of six mounted men: three crossbowmen and three drivers.

Only incomplete copies of De arte survive. All stop abruptly in the middle of the fourteenth section. The text is of interest to Romance philologists for its terms derived from the Romance languages.

=== Manuscripts ===
The four manuscripts that preserve the text are:

- Chantilly, Musée Condé, Lat. 368, folios 99v–105r (Milan, 1459)
- New Haven, Yale University, Beinecke Rare Book and Manuscript Library, MS 127, folios 73r–75v (14th century)
- Vatican City, Biblioteca Apostolica, Vat. lat. 5366, folios 75v–78v (late 13th century)
- Vatican City, Biblioteca Apostolica, Reg. lat. 1227, folios 66v–70 (15th century)

All but perhaps the Yale manuscript appear to be the product of Italian scribes. Reg. lat. 1227 was copied from the Chantilly manuscript. The Yale manuscript is a poor copy. The best manuscript is either the Chantilly manuscript or Vat. lat. 5366. Lindner's edition uses the latter as a base text, while Tilander opts for the Chantilly. Lindner translated De arte into German and Tilander into French.

The Chantilly manuscript contains a series of miniature of dogs in training, but none in the act of hunting.

== Editions ==
- Guicennas (1956). Tilander, Gunnar (ed.). De arte bersandi: Le plus ancien traité de chasse de l'Occident. Uppsala.
- Guicennas (1966) [1954]. Lindner, Kurt (ed.). De arte bersandi: Ein Tractat des 13. Jahrhunderts über die Jagd auf Rotwild. De Gruyter. doi:10.1515/9783111630410.
