= Rache =

Dog Breed

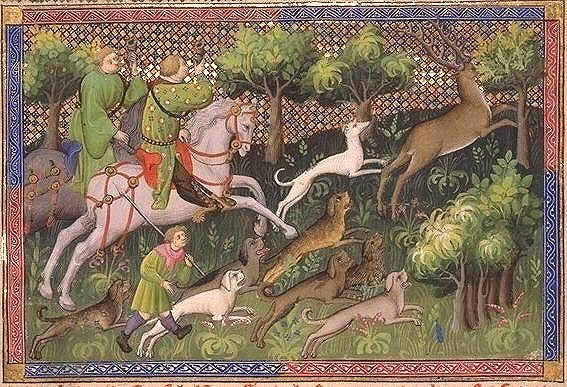
Raches (and a greyhound) pursuing the hart from Livre de la Chasse, a 15th-century MS of Gaston Phoebus

Rache /ˈrætʃ/, also spelled racch, rach, and ratch, from Old English ræcc, linked to Old Norse rakkí, is an obsolete name for a type of hunting dog used in Great Britain in the Middle Ages. It was a scenthound used in a pack to run down and kill game, or bring it to bay. The word appears before the Norman Conquest. It was sometimes confused with 'brache', (also 'bratchet') which is a French derived word for a female scenthound.

In medieval hunting in England and Northern Europe, pursuit of the hart or wild boar involved using a 'limer' or 'lyam hound' (a hound handled on a leash or 'lyam') to trace the animal from its footprints or droppings to where it was browsing or lying up. This became known as 'harbouring' the animal. When this had been done, the huntsman reported back to his lord, who then brought the pack of raches to chase it down on its hot scent when it had been unharboured, 'rowsed' or 'upreared'. Sometimes, pairs of raches were held at strategic points along where the quarry was expected to run, to be uncoupled when the huntsman blew the signal, or when the quarry was seen to come close. The Bloodhound was typically used as a limer, and the raches were normally smaller hounds. A lord's pack would include one or two limers to about 20 or more raches.

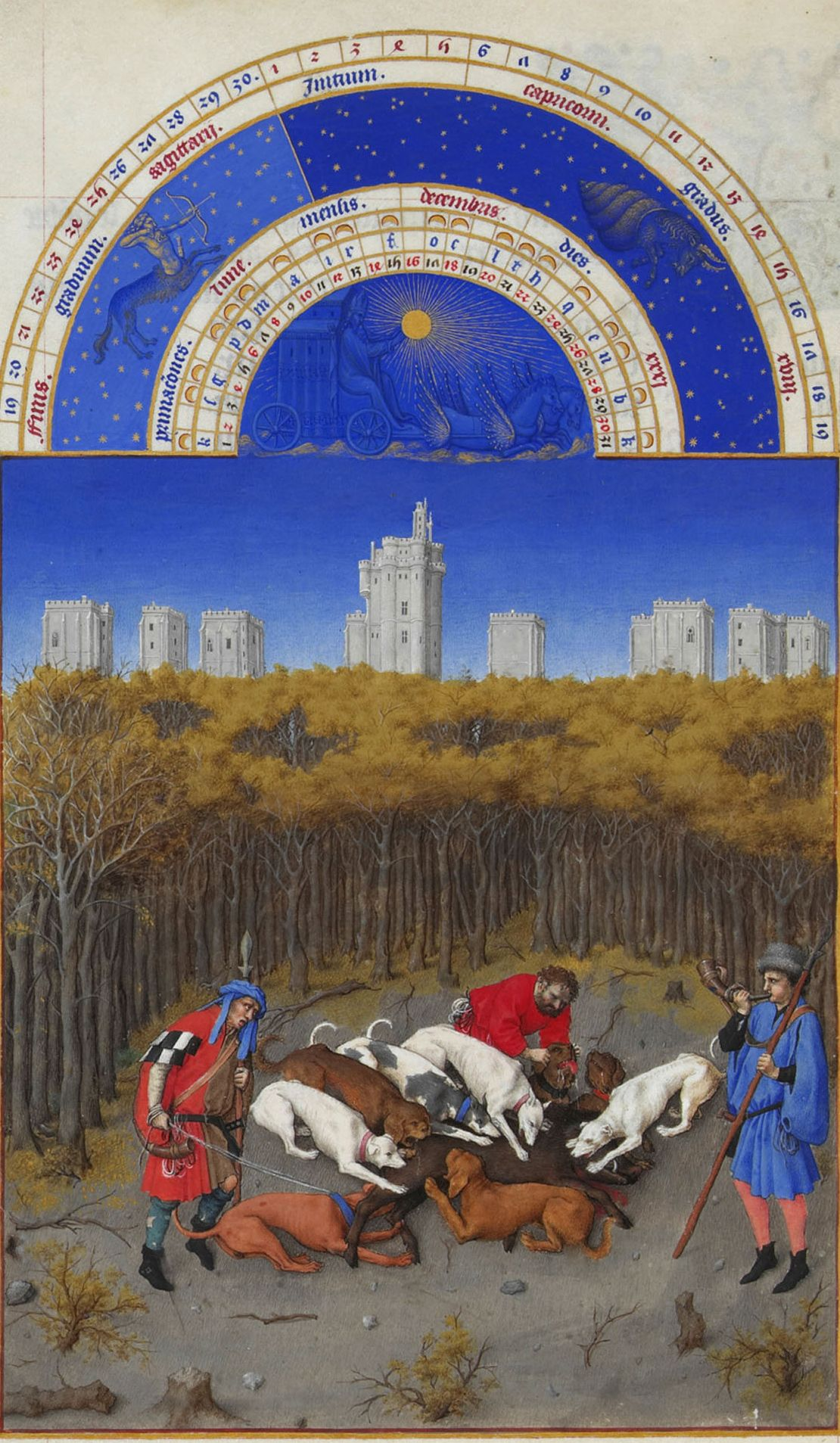
Raches killing a wild boar

A king or lord would want to hunt a great stag, a 'hart of ten', or 'warrantable' stag, or a powerful boar, partly for the extra fat it carried when in prime condition in the hunting season, but mostly for the prestige.

In Sir Gawain and the Green Knight, Bloodhounds announce the presence of a great boar hiding in a thicket, which then rushes out and plays havoc among the raches of the knight's pack.

Not all game was hunted using the limer. Dame Juliana Berners, writing in The Book of Saint Albans (1486) writes (translation):

'My dear sons, I will now teach each one of you how many kinds of beasts must be upreared with the limer in wood or in fields - both the hart and the buck and the boar so wild. All other animals which are hunted must be sought and found with free-running raches ("ratches so fre").'

Other writers might include the hare, bear, or wolf among animals to be harboured with the limer, but clearly raches could be hunted simply as a pack, as in modern hunting, if chasing 'lesser' game.

After c. 1530 the term 'rache' was hardly used in England, 'running hound' (tr. of chien courant), or mostly just 'hound', being preferred, but the term was still used for a while in Scotland, where the Bloodhound was called the sleuth hound. Hector Boece (1536) describes the rache in Scotland as a versatile scenthound, able to find flesh, fowl, or even fish among the rocks, by smelling. His translator, Bellenden, says that it is not a large as the sleuth hound. The picture below, though it did not appear in Boece's original, was first published to illustrate his account when it was summarised in Conrad Gessner's Historiae Animalium (Zurich 1554, in Latin).

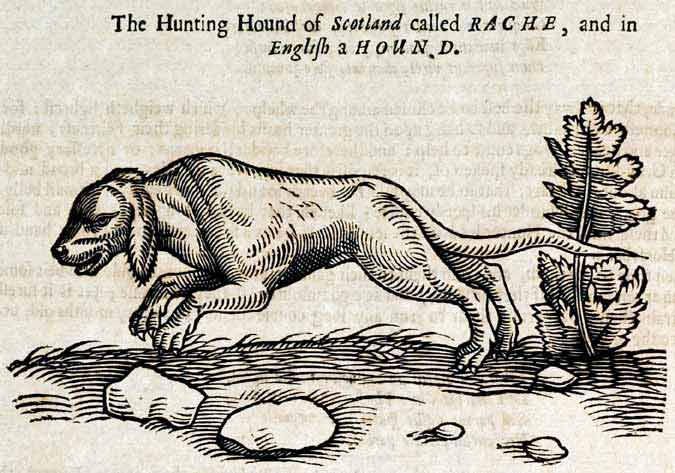
The Scottish Rache

Obviously raches must have far outnumbered Bloodhounds in the medieval dog population, and may have been quite disparate, depending on the sort of game they were used to hunt. In the picture above from Les Très Riches Heures du Duc de Berry (1410) the raches are not all of the same breed. In Great Britain, they may have included the now-extinct North Country Beagle and Southern Hound. As styles of hunting changed, and the Bloodhound fell out of use, packs were normally employed on their own to hunt all quarry. Though their name became obsolete, raches must have continued in this use. We may assume that it was from them, rather than the Bloodhound, that the various breeds of pack hounds such as the English Foxhound, English Staghound, Harrier and Beagle were developed. It is apparent that in the 16th and 17th centuries there was a good deal of regional variation in sizes and types of scenthound, from which the prospective Master of Hounds could mix and match to form his pack.
