= Livre de chasse =

Medieval book on hunting written between 1387 and 1389

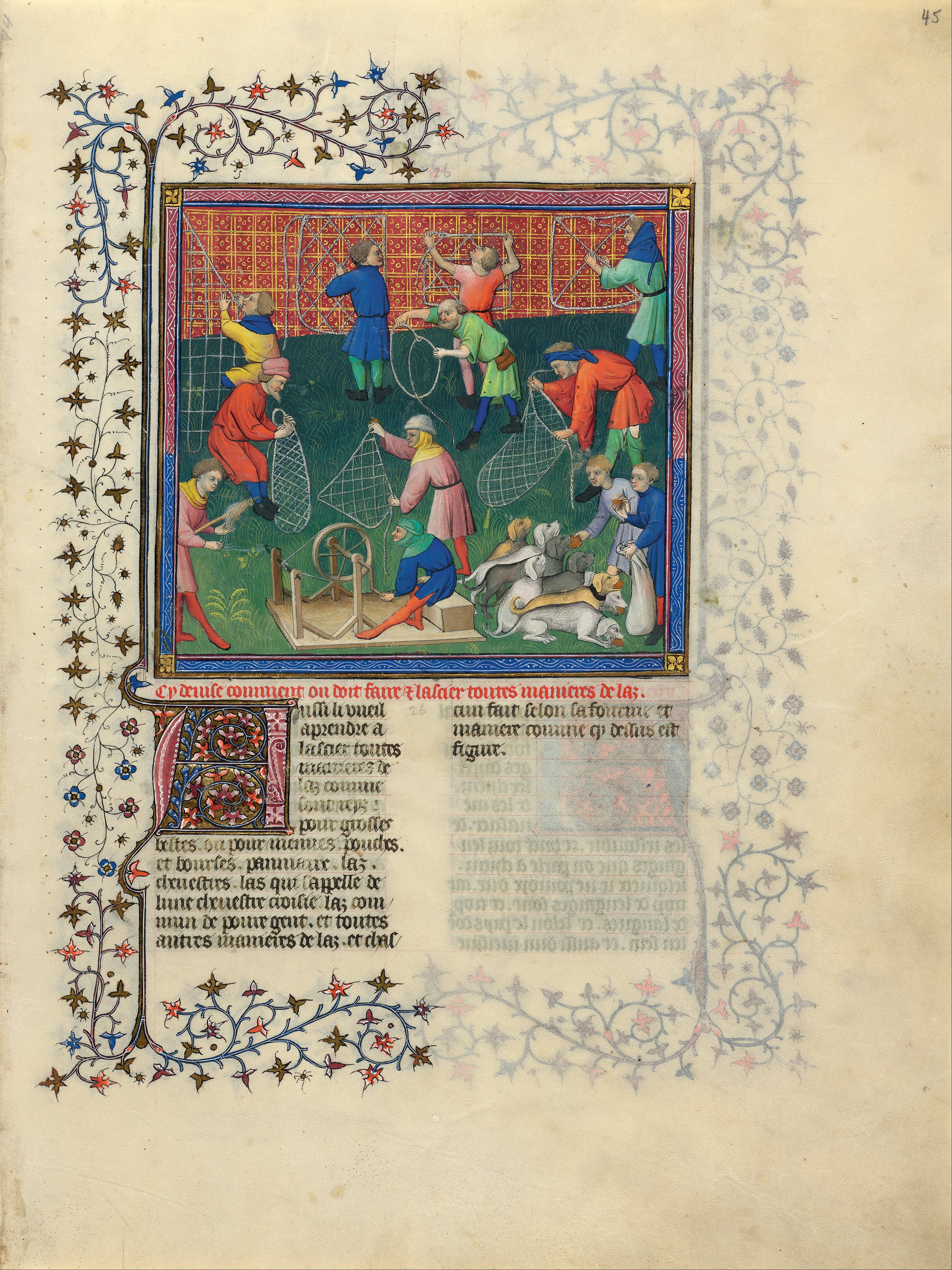
- Ex Libris of the Morgan Library manuscript
- Also known as: Foix, Franc
- Language: French
- Author: Gaston III, Count of Foix also known as Gaston Fébus or Gaston Phoebus
- Dedicated to: Philip the Bold

The Livre de chasse is a medieval book on hunting, written between 1387 and 1389 by Gaston III, Count of Foix, also known as Fébus or Phoebus, and dedicated to Philip the Bold, Duke of Burgundy. Fébus was one of the greatest huntsmen of his day and his treatise became the standard text on medieval hunting techniques. It was described by scholar, Hannele Klemettilä, as "one of the most influential texts of its era".

The book has four parts:

- On Gentle and Wild Beasts
- On the Nature and Care of Dogs
- On Instructions for Hunting with Dogs
- On Hunting with Traps, Snares, and Crossbow

== Editions and translations ==
The text was translated (and adapted) into English by Edward of Norwich, 2nd Duke of York, between 1406 and 1413, as The Master of Game of which 27 manuscripts survive.

The work was printed three times in the 16th century (once around 1500 and twice around 1507), and has gone through several modern editions since 1854, most recently in Das Jagdbuch des Mittelalters. Ms. fr. 616 der Bibliothèque nationale in Paris, edited by W. Schlag and Marcel Thomas (Glanzlichter der Buchkunst 4; Graz, 1994; reprinted 2001), and Livre de la chasse, Gaston Fébus (Barcelona: M. Moleiro Editor, 2019) featuring the first complete English translation of the text in the manuscript Français 616.

== Manuscripts ==
Some forty-four manuscripts survive, including Ms. fr. 616 from the French National Library, which has been reprinted several times. The full list includes the following:

- MS IV 1050 – Royal Library of Belgium, Brussels.
- Typ 130 – Houghton Library, Harvard University, Cambridge (Mass).
- Ms. 343 – Bibliothèque Inguimbertine, Carpentras.
- Ms. 367 (480) – Bibliothèque et Archives du Château de Chantilly, Chantilly.
- Oc. 61 – Sächsische Landesbibliothek, Dresden.
- Ms. 169 – Bibliothèque de Genève, Geneva.
- Hunter 385 (V.2.5) – Glasgow University Library, Glasgow.
- Rastatt 124 – Badische Landesbibliothek, Karlsruhe.
- Add. 27699 – The British Library, London.
- MS. 27 – J. Paul Getty Museum, Los Angeles.
- Ms. 765 – Bibliothèque municipale de Lyon.
- Ms. 22 – Musée Dobrée, Nantes.
- MS M. 1044 – Morgan Library, New York.
- MS fr. 616, MS fr. 617, MS fr. 618, MS fr. 619, MS fr. 620, MS fr. 1289, MS fr. 1291, MS fr. 1293, MS fr. 1294, MS fr. 1295, MS fr. 12398 – Bibliothèque nationale de France, Paris.
- Ms. 6529 – Musée national du Château de Pau, Pau.
- HB XI 34a – Württembergische Landesbibliothek, Stuttgart.
- J.a.VIII.6 – Archivio di Stato di Torino, Turin.
- Ms. 841 – Bibliothèque municipale de Tours
- Reginensi latini 1323, Reginensi latini 1326, Reginensi latini 1331 – Vatican Library, Vatican City.
