= Christopher Besoldus =

German jurist

Christopher Besoldus (Christoph Besold) (1577 – September 1638) was a German jurist and publicist whose writing is seen as important for the history of the causes of the Thirty Years' War.

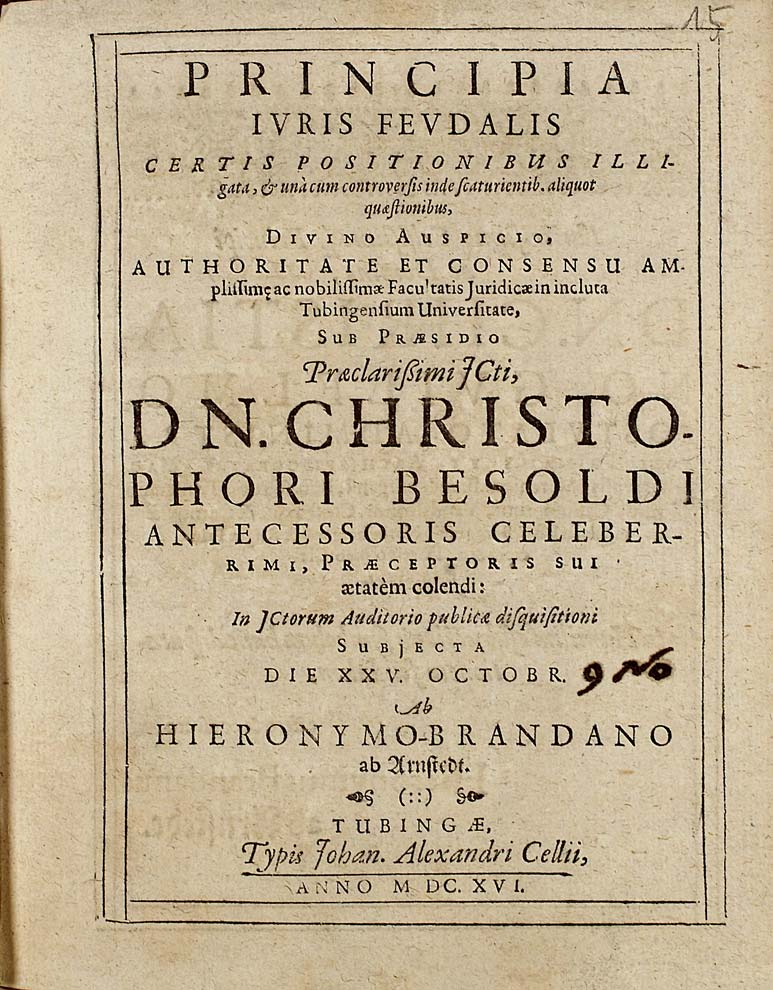
Title page of Principia Iuris Feudalis by Christoph Besold (Tübingen 1616).

== Life ==
He was born of Protestant parents in 1577 at Tübingen, Württemberg. He studied jurisprudence, and in the early 1590s was a close friend of Johannes Kepler. Besold asked permission of the classical scholar Vitus Müller (Veit Müller, 1561–1626) to defend theses based on Kepler's dissertation (on astronomical topics); he was denied the chance. Later, when Katharina Kepler, Johannes Kepler's mother, was prosecuted on witchcraft charges, Besold was one of the jurists dealing with the case, which was dropped.

He graduated as Doctor of Law in 1598; and in 1610 became professor of law at Tübingen. Among his pupils was Johannes Valentinus Andreae. Besold was one of the influences on Andreae's later Rosicrucian writings, along with Tobias Hess. His advice was frequently sought in juridical questions by the civil administration.

He read the Scriptures, the writings of the Church Fathers, and of the medieval mystics. He was publicly converted to Catholicism at Heilbronn in 1635. Two years later, he accepted the chair of Roman Law at the University of Ingolstadt. He was considering the offer of a professorship at the University of Bologna, tendered him by Pope Urban VIII, when he died at Ingolstadt.

== Works ==
He knew 9 languages including Arabic and Hebrew. His works are numerous, with 102 scholarly writings known. His theory of federalism was influential in explaining the workings of the Holy Roman Empire. He was one of the earliest writers on public finance, with Eberhard von Weyhe, Georg Obrecht, and Jacob Bornitz.

The Thesaurus Practicus (1629), an alphabetical and encyclopedic work defining legal and other terms, ran to many editions, being taken up by his student Johann Jacob Speidel (died 1666) and others.

His publication of three volumes of documents from the Stuttgart archives was tendentious. Their contents suggested that the immediate dependency of the Württemberg monasteries on the Empire (Reichsunmittelbarkeit) implied for the local dukes the obligation of restoring the confiscated religious property.

He translated the satirical Ragguagli di Parnaso of Trajano Boccalini.

- Signatura temporum, 1614.
- Axiomatha philosophica-theologica, Strasburg 1616.
- Politicorum libri due, Frankfurt 1618.
- De verae philosophiae fundamento discursus, Tübingen 1619.
- Pentas Dissertationum philologicarum, Tübingen 1620.
