= Tobias Hess =

German lawyer and physician (1558–1614)

Tobias Hess (31 January 1558 – 24 November 1614) was a German lawyer based in Tübingen. He practised as a Paracelsian physician.

Hess was influenced by Simon Studion. He has been identified, alongside Christoph Besold and Johannes Valentinus Andreae, as one of the authors of the Rosicrucian manifestos. In 1597, he corresponded with Simon Studion and agreed with him that the Papacy must fall in 1604.
