= George Turberville =

English poet (c. 1540 – before 1597)

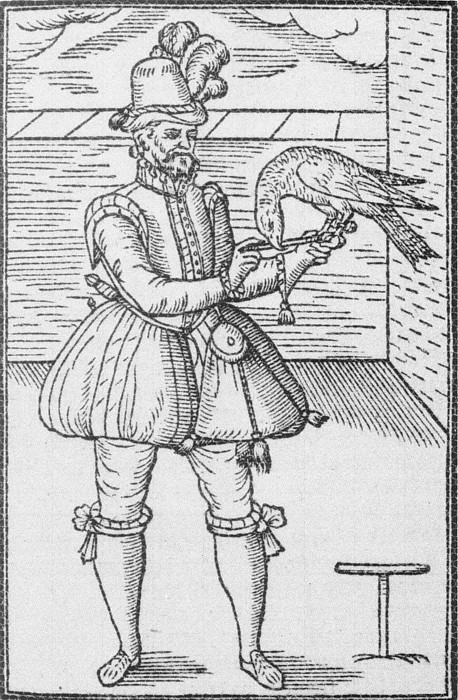
A falconer, woodcut illustration from Turberville's Book of Falconry or Hawking (1575).

George Turberville, or Turbervile (about 1540 – before 1597) was an English poet.

== Life ==
He was the second son of Henry Turberville of Winterborne Whitechurch, Dorset, and nephew of James Turberville, Bishop of Exeter. The Turbervilles were an old Dorsetshire family, the inspiration for the d'Urbervilles of Thomas Hardy's novel, Tess of the d'Urbervilles.

Turberville became a scholar of Winchester College in 1554, and in 1561 was made a fellow of New College, Oxford. In 1562 he began to study law in London, and gained a reputation, according to Anthony à Wood, as a poet and man of affairs. He accompanied Thomas Randolph on a special mission to Moscow to the court of Ivan the Terrible in 1568. Of his Poems describing the Places and Manners of the Country and People of Russia mentioned by Wood, only three metrical letters describing his adventures survive, and these were reprinted in Hakluyt's Voyages (1589).

His Epitaphs, Epigrams, Songs and Sonnets appeared "newly corrected with additions" in 1567. In the same year he published translations of the Heroycall Epistles of Ovid, and of the Eglogs of Mantuan (Gianbattista Spagnuoli, also known as Mantuanus), and in 1568 A Plaine Path to Perfect Vertue from Dominicus Mancinus. The Book of Falconry or Hawking and the Noble Art of Venerie (printed together in 1575) are sometimes both assigned to Turberville though the second of these is a translation by George Gascoigne from the French work La Venerie (1561) by Jacques du Fouilloux. The title page of his Tragical Tales (1587), which are translations from Boccaccio and Bandello, says that the book was written at the time of the author's unstated troubles. Wood says he was living and in high esteem in 1594.

== See also ==
- Canons of Elizabethan poetry
