= The Master of Game =

15th-century manuscript on hunting

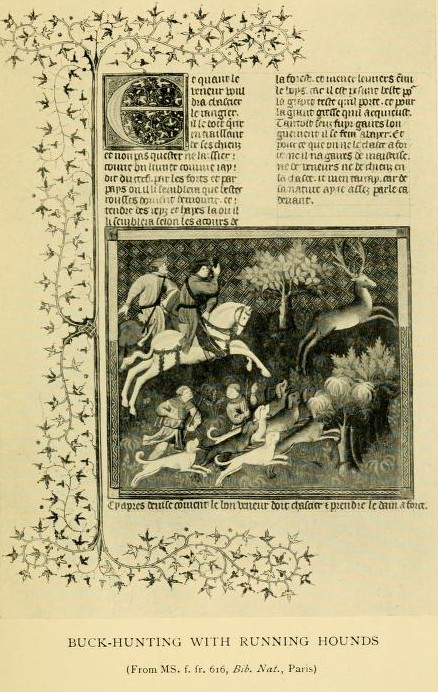
- "Buck Hunting with Running Hounds" (1904 edition)
- Author: Edward, Duke of York
- Original title: The Mayster of Game
- Translator: William Adolf Baillie Grohman and Florence Baillie-Grohman
- Language: Middle English
- Subject: Medieval hunting
- Genre: hunting treatise
- Publication date: 1413, 1904
- Publication place: England
- Dewey Decimal: 799.2

The Master of Game is a medieval hunting treatise translated into English by Edward of Norwich, 2nd Duke of York, between 1406 and 1413, of which 27 manuscripts survive.

York was Henry IV's Master of the Hart Hounds. Between 1406 and 1413 he translated and dedicated to the Prince of Wales the Livre de Chasse of Gaston III, Count of Foix, one of the most famous of the hunting treatises of the Middle Ages, to which he added five chapters of his own, the English version being known as The Master of Game.

It is considered to be the oldest English-language book on hunting. The Master of Game was first printed in 1904 in modernised English by William and Florence Baillie-Grohman, with an essay on medieval hunting, and a foreword by then-American President and noted hunter Theodore Roosevelt.

== Overview ==
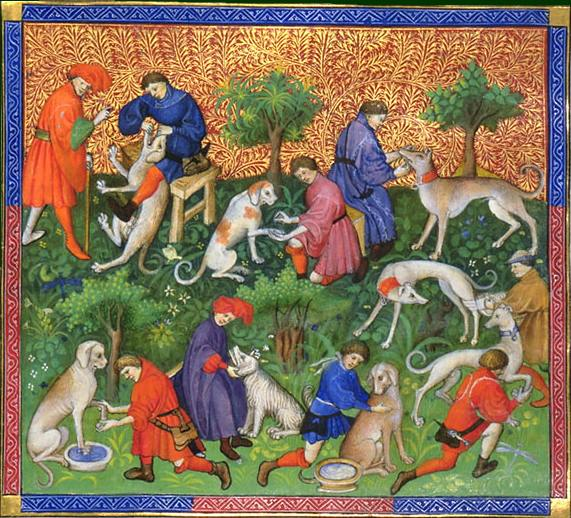
Gaston III, Count of Foix, Book of the Hunt, 1387–88

Written between 1406 and 1413 by Edward, second Duke of York, The Master of Game is mostly a translation of an earlier work by Gaston Phoebus entitled Livre de chasse, and is considered to be the oldest English-language book on hunting. Edward held the position of master of game during the reign of Henry IV and in a prologue dedicated the book to Henry, Prince of Wales, later to become Henry V, as a set of instructions on how to proceed with the hunt. Although The Master of Game is mostly based on the earlier work, Edward added an additional five chapters which dealt with English hunting, including comprehensive coverage of hunting for deer and hare in the English style.

Several chapters from the previous work were also omitted, including sections on the ibex and the reindeer which were not relevant quarry for medieval Englishmen. Other chapters omitted included those on trapping and the conduct of hunts in France, including an early French description of a modest form of coursing hares for the pot, a la croupie, by a couple of men and their greyhounds.

== Modern publication ==
The work was first published as a printed work in 1904, with multiple later editions, including a foreword by Theodore Roosevelt who at the time was President of the United States and modernised by William Adolf Baillie Grohman and his wife Florence. It included some of the illustrations from the original French Livre de Chasse, and also added a glossary to explain the meaning and terms of medieval hunting. At the time it was republished, only nineteen copies of the original text were known, two of the best preserved copies were on the shelves of the British Library and one in the Bodleian Library. A further reprint was made in paperback in 2005, which was a straight reprint of the 1909 edition including the black-and-white reproductions of the original illuminations.

The text was presented for the first time as a scholarly collation of all the existing manuscripts, in modern English, analysed in comparison to the original French, as an assessment of literary relations, by James I. McNelis III.
