= Salon d'Or, Homburg =

Painting by William Powell Frith

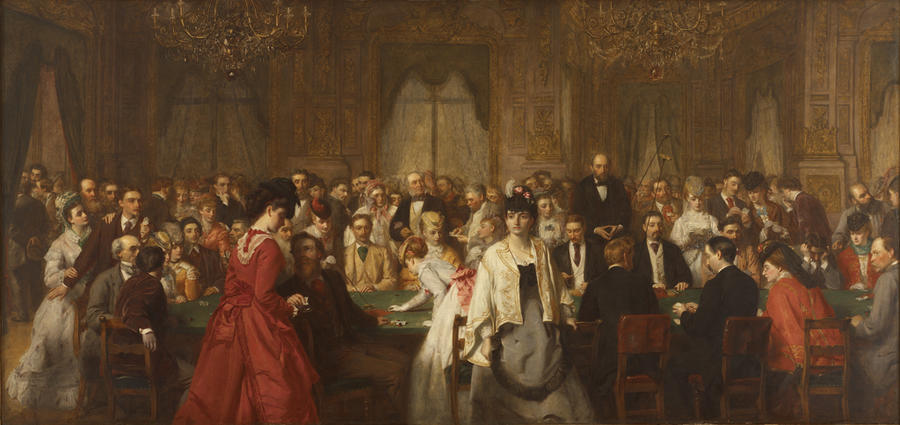
William Powell Frith. The Salon d'Or, Homburg, 1871. Rhode Island School of Design Museum

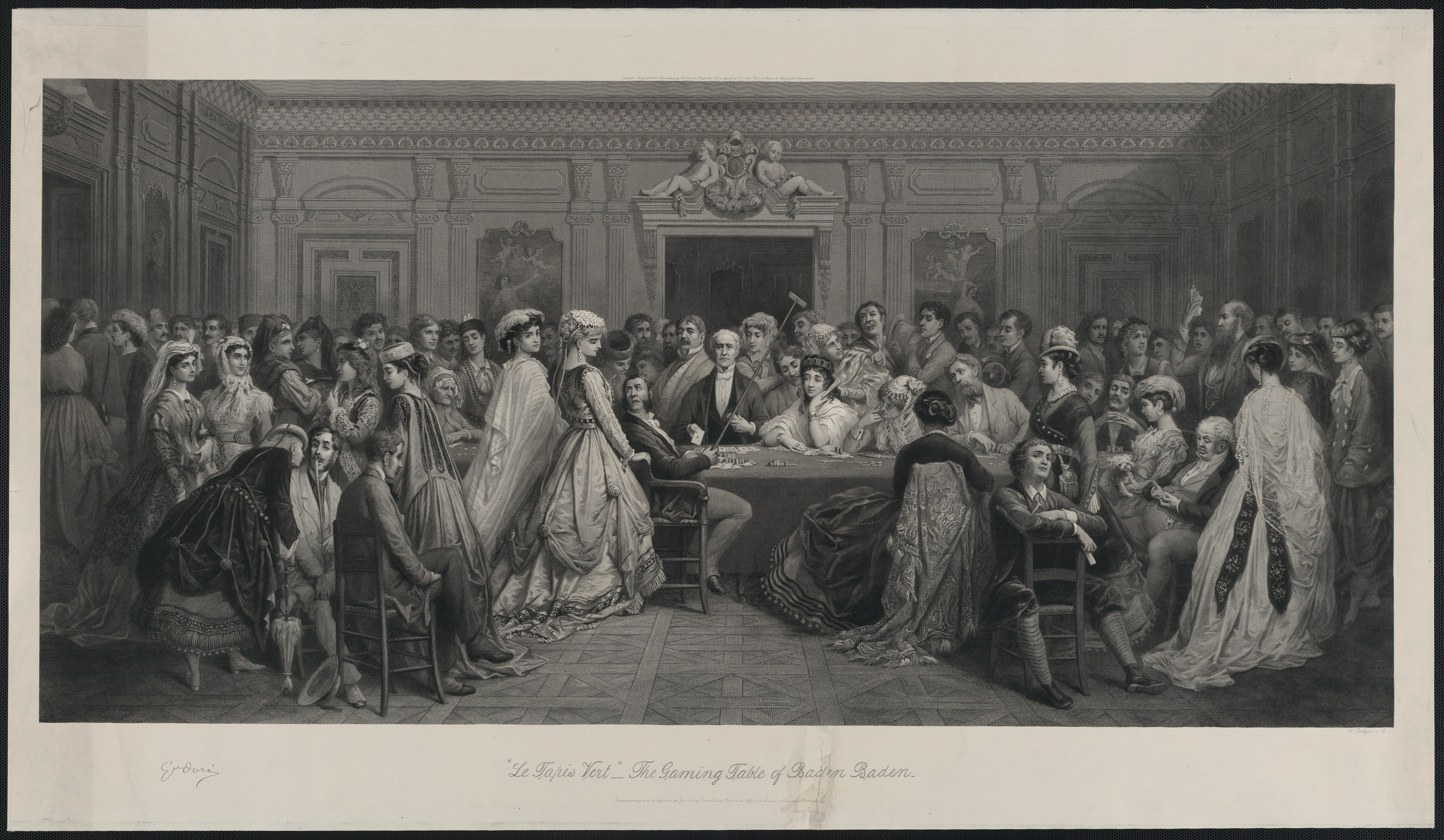
Le Tapis Vert (Gambling at Baden-Baden), 1883 engraving by William Ridgway, after an 1867 painting by Gustave Doré

Salon D'Or, Homburg, is an 1871 oil painting by the English artist William Powell Frith. It is held by the Rhode Island School of Design Museum in Providence, Rhode Island.

== History and description ==
The painting measures 125.1 by 260.4 centimetres (49.3 in × 102.5 in). It depicts an interior scene at the Bad Homburg casino, run by the twin brothers François Blanc and Louis Blanc who would later run the Monte Carlo Casino. Frith visited Bad Homburg in 1869 with a friend, O'Neil. The popular casino near Frankfurt was due to close in 1871 when its 30-year lease expired. Frith was following several contemporaneous works of art and literature which had focussed on gambling and casinos, including artworks such as Alfred Elmore's 1865 On the Brink and Gustave Doré's 1867 Le Tapis Vert, and literary works such as Anthony Trollope's 1864 Can You Forgive Her? and Feodor Dostoyevsky's 1869 The Gambler.

Frith used photography to capture the scene, and made many preparatory drawings and sketches to establish the final composition. The central figure is a woman in grey, turning away from the tables with blank expression, apparently having lost heavily. A man and a woman to her right look on unapprovingly: portraits of Frith and his wife. He used a landscape format to show the crowds of fashionable people around the gambling tables. His depiction include his typically characterful vignettes, but there are some differences between his final sketch and the completed work. For example, in the sketch, an older man seated in the left foreground gives some money from his winnings to his mistress; in the oil painting, a younger man is seeking more money from his wife so he can keep playing.

The completed painting was exhibited at the Royal Academy summer exhibition at Burlington House in 1871, with the subtitle "Le jeu est fait – Rien ne va plus" (French: "The stakes are set – No more bets"). It received mixed reviews – some critics preferred the repulsive realism of Doré, but Frith's work became so popular with the viewing public that a barrier was erected to keep back the crowd, an accolade rarely accorded: the previous two instances were Frith's The Derby Day in 1858, and David Wilkie's Chelsea Pensioners reading the Waterloo Dispatch in 1822. It was also exhibited at the Exposition Universelle in Paris in 1878.

Frith then embarked on a Hogarthian series of paintings on moral subjects, The Road to Ruin, which follows the descending path of a wealthy young gentleman who becomes embroiled in gambling and loses his fortune. This series needed another rail when exhibited at the Royal Academy, also in 1878.

Frith had sold Salon D'Or to the art dealer Louis Victor Flatow in 1870 for £4,000, including the copyright. Flatow had the work engraved by the printmaker Charles George Lewis, but Frith was unhappy with the quality of the resulting prints when they were published from 1876. Flatow sold the painting in 1874 for £1,995, without the reproduction rights. Victorian paintings became deeply unfashionable in the early 20th century, and it was auctioned at Christie's in 1932 for just £48 6s, sold to Walter Lowry of New York. He later donated it to the Rhode Island School of Design Museum. A smaller version 44 by 91.4 centimetres (17.3 in × 36.0 in) was acquired by the National Gallery of Canada in 1964.
