= Kate Nickleby at Madame Mantalini's =

Painting by William Powell Frith

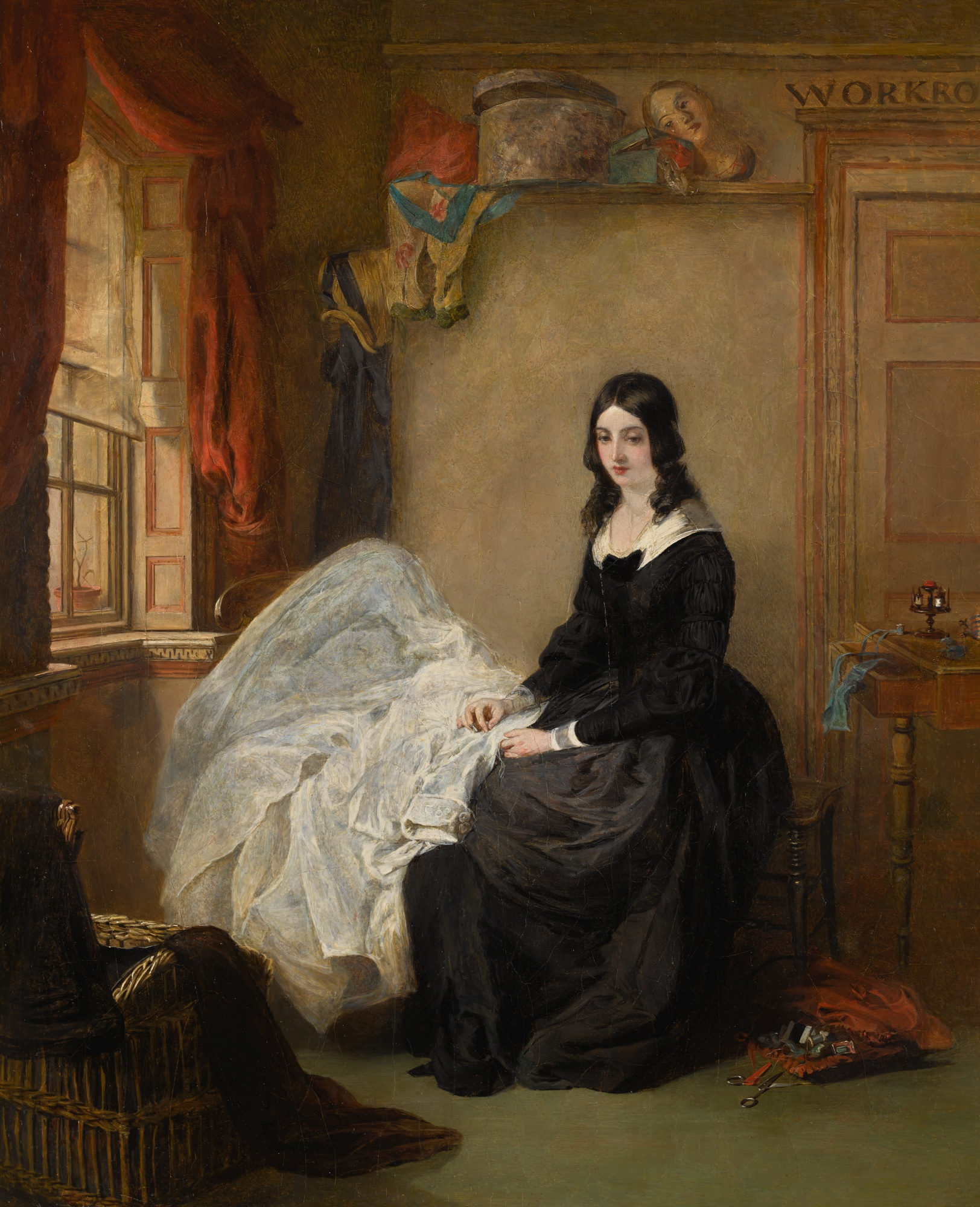
- Artist: William Powell Frith
- Year: 1842
- Type: Oil on canvas, genre painting
- Dimensions: 61 cm × 51 cm (24 in × 20 in)
- Location: Private collection

Kate Nickleby at Madame Mantalini's is an 1842 oil painting by the British artist William Powell Frith. It depicts a scene from the 1839 novel Nicholas Nickleby by Charles Dickens. Kate Nickleby, the protagonist's sister, is shown working as a milliner in the backroom of the fashionable dress shop of Madame Mantalini in Mayfair allowing her thoughts to briefly wander elsewhere.

The twenty three year old Frith had produced a painting Dolly Varden based on a character from Dickens' novel Barnaby Rudge. The author was so impressed by the work, which he saw at the Society of British Artists, that he commissioned two paintings from Frith. The first was a second version of Dolly Varden and the other was this painting. The commission developed into a lifelong friendship between the two. Dickens lent the painting to the National Art Union of Ireland so that an engraving could be produced by William Holl. The painting hung in Dickens' dining room at Gads Hill Place in Kent. After his death the work was sold for two hundred guineas.

== 1856 version ==
Kate Nickleby at Madame Mantalini's, 1856 version by Frith

In 1856 Frith produced a different version of the same theme. The painting was displayed at the Royal Academy Exhibition of 1857 held at the National Gallery in London, it was one of only two works he submitted that year while he was working on his The Derby Day.

== Bibliography ==
- Bills, Mark & Knight, Vivien (ed.) William Powell Frith: Painting the Victorian Age. Yale University Press, 2006
- Green, Richard & Sellars, Jane. William Powell Frith: The People's Painter. Bloomsbury, 2019.
- Wood, Christopher. William Powell Frith: A Painter and His World. Sutton Publishing, 2006.
