= Henry VIII and Anne Boleyn Deer Shooting in Windsor Forest =

Painting by William Powell Frith

- Artist: William Powell Frith
- Year: 1872
- Type: Oil on canvas, history painting
- Dimensions: 123 cm × 101 cm (48 in × 40 in)
- Location: Private collection

Henry VIII and Anne Boleyn Deer Shooting in Windsor Forest is an oil on canvas history painting by the British artist William Powell Frith, from 1872. It depicts a scene from the Tudor era. It is held in a private collection.

== History and description ==
The painting shows Henry VIII and his second wife Anne Boleyn hunting deer in the forest outside of Windsor. The king holds back a branch for Anne as she takes aim with a crossbow. Frith used Holbein's portrait of Boleyn to produce her likeness and the judge Sir William Hardman to model the king who he resembled physically. Frith was inspired by a passage in James Anthony Froude's History of England describing the scene.

Early in his career Frith had been a member of The Clique and went on to become a prominent artist of the Victorian era, known for his panoramic scenes of everyday life as well as depictions of historical and literary scenes. The painting was displayed at the Royal Academy Exhibition of 1872 held at Burlington House in London's Piccadilly. It was auctioned by Christie's in 1999.

== Bibliography ==
- Bills, Mark & Knight, Vivien (ed.) William Powell Frith: Painting the Victorian Age. Yale University Press, 2006
- Green, Richard & Sellars, Jane. William Powell Frith: The People's Painter. Bloomsbury, 2019.
- Wood, Christopher. William Powell Frith: A Painter and His World. Sutton Publishing, 2006.
