= Mary, Queen of Scots Bidding Farewell to France =

Painting by William Powell Frith

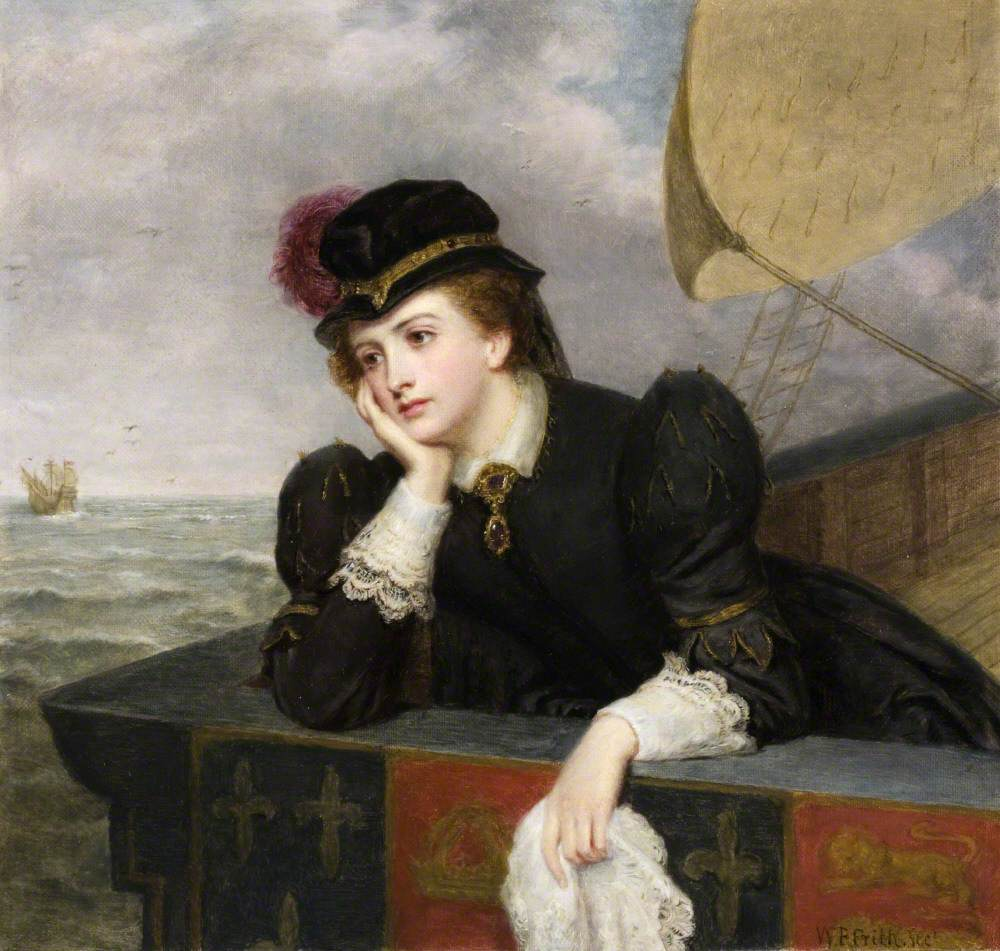
- Artist: William Powell Frith
- Year: 1893
- Type: Oil on canvas, history painting
- Dimensions: 33.5 cm × 35 cm (13.2 in × 14 in)
- Location: Newton House, Llandeilo

Mary, Queen of Scots Bidding Farewell to France, 1561 is an oil on canvas history painting by the British artist William Powell Frith, from 1893. It shows the young Mary, Queen of Scots departing from Calais to return to her native Scotland following the death of her first husband Francis II of France. She is shown leaning against the stern of the ship, a handkerchief in her hand, looking pensive.

Frith was inspired by an 1844 poem by Pierre-Jean de Béranger. He had produced an earlier painting inspired by the story in 1851. His later version was displayed at the Royal Academy Exhibition of 1893 at Burlington House, in London. Today the painting is part of the collection of Newton House, in Llandeilo, Wales, under the oversight of the National Trust.

Henry Nelson O'Neil, like Frith a former member of The Clique, produced his own version of the scene, Mary Stuart's Farewell to France in 1862.

== Bibliography ==
- Bills, Mark & Knight, Vivien (ed.) William Powell Frith: Painting the Victorian Age. Yale University Press, 2006
- Green, Richard & Sellars, Jane. William Powell Frith: The People's Painter. Bloomsbury, 2019.
- Wood, Christopher. William Powell Frith: A Painter and His World. Sutton Publishing, 2006.
