= William Powell Frith =

English painter (1819–1909)

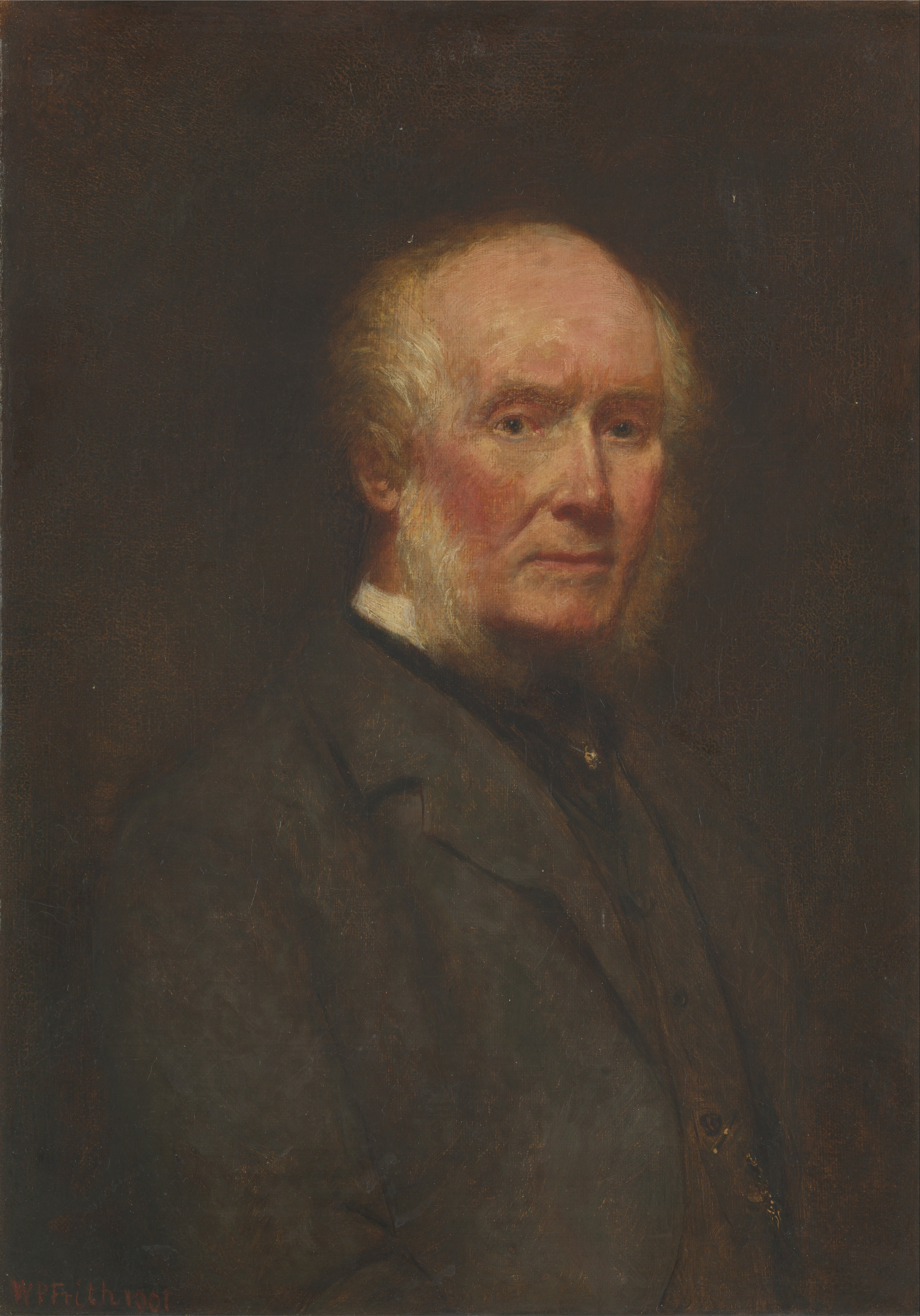
- Self-Portrait at the Age of 82 (1901)
- Born: 9 January 1819; Aldfield, England
- Died: 2 November 1909 (aged 90); London, England
- Known for: Painting

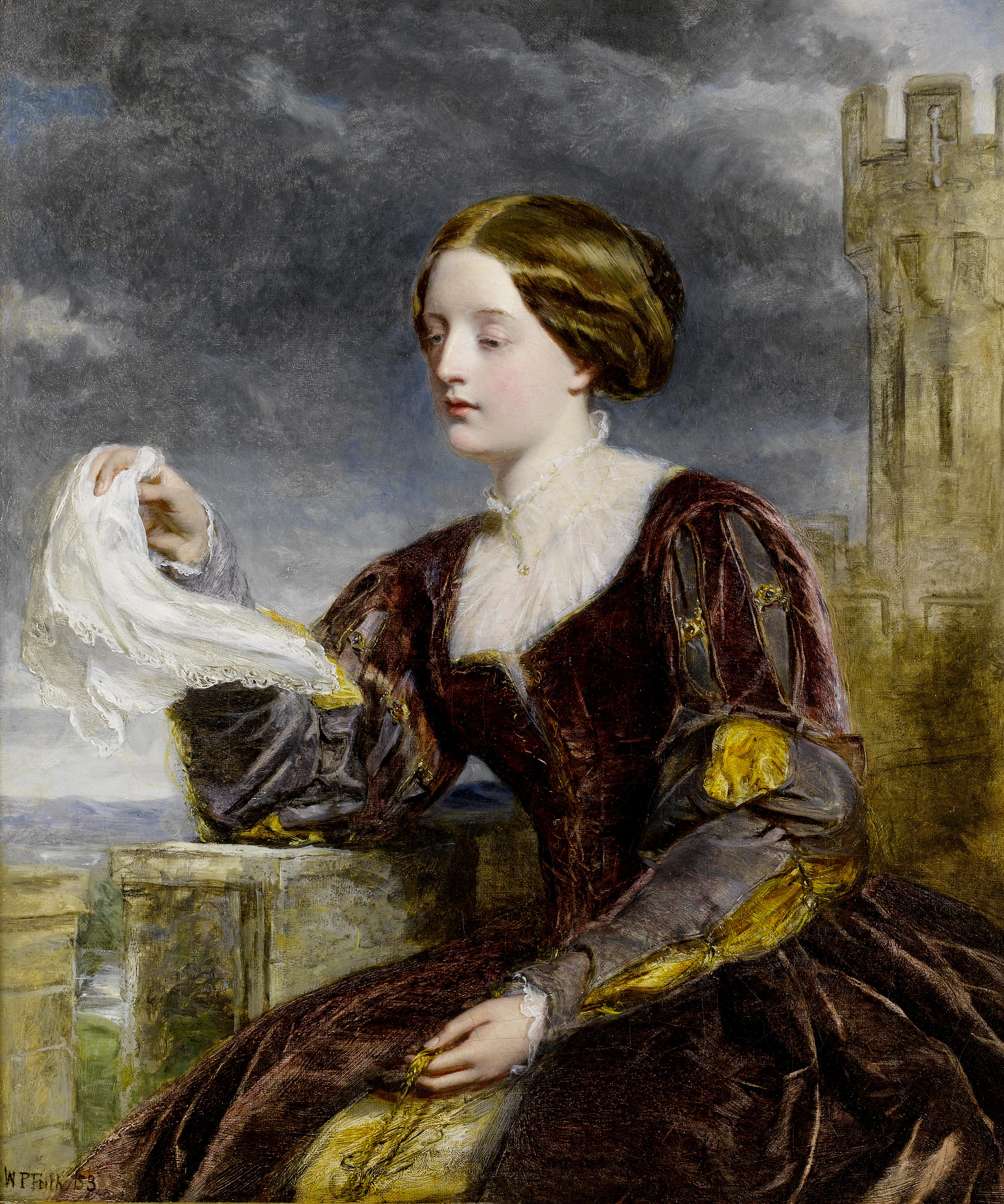
The Signal, 1858

William Powell Frith RA (9 January 1819 – 2 November 1909) was an English painter specialising in genre subjects and panoramic narrative works of life in the Victorian era. He was elected to the Royal Academy in 1853, presenting The Sleeping Model as his Diploma work. He has been described as the "greatest British painter of the social scene since Hogarth".

== Early life ==
William Powell Frith was born in Aldfield, near Ripon in the then West Riding of Yorkshire on 9 January 1819. He had originally intended to be an auctioneer. His mother was Jane Frith, née Powell (1779–1851). Frith was encouraged to take up art by his father, a hotelier in Harrogate. Frith was great uncle and an advisor to the English school portrait painter Henry Keyworth Raine (1872–1932).

He moved to London in 1835 where he began his formal art studies at Sass's Academy in Charlotte Street, before attending the Royal Academy Schools. Frith started his career as a portrait painter and first exhibited at the British Institution in 1838. In the 1840s he often based works on the literary output of writers such as Charles Dickens, whose portrait he painted (in 1859), and Laurence Sterne.

== Career ==
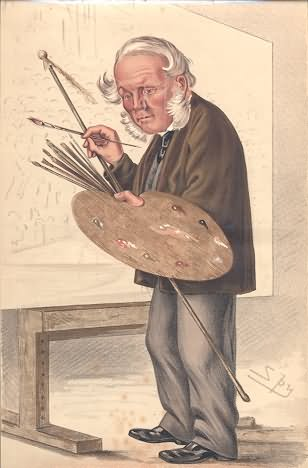
Mr WP Frith RA as portrayed by Spy in Vanity Fair, 10 May 1873. Caption reads "The Derby-Day".

He was a member of The Clique, which also included Richard Dadd. The principal influence on his work was the hugely popular domestic subjects painted by Sir David Wilkie. Wilkie's famous painting The Chelsea Pensioners was a spur to the creation of Frith's own most famous compositions. Following the precedent of Wilkie, but also imitating the work of his friend Dickens, Frith created complex multi-figure compositions depicting the full range of the Victorian class system, meeting and interacting in public places. In 'Ramsgate Sands' (also known as 'Life at the Seaside', 1854) he depicted visitors and entertainers at the seaside resort. He followed this with The Derby Day, depicting scenes among the crowd at the race at Epsom Downs, which was based on photographic studies by Robert Howlett. This 1858 composition was bought by Jacob Bell for £1,500. It was so popular that it had to be protected by a specially installed rail when shown at the Royal Academy of Arts. Another well-known painting was The Railway Station, a scene of Paddington station. In 1863 he was chosen to paint the marriage of the Prince of Wales (later King Edward VII) and Princess Alexandra of Denmark.

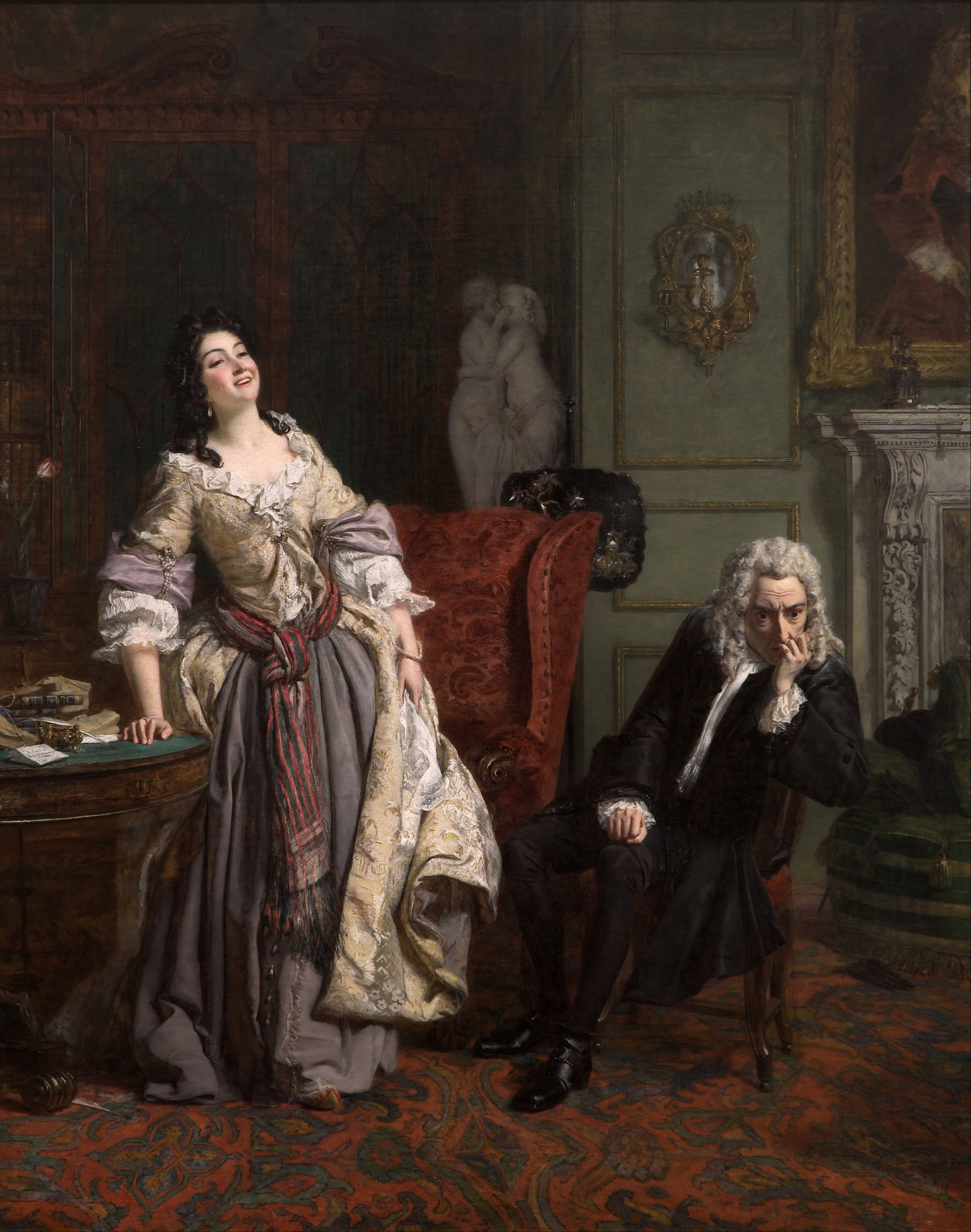
The Rejected Poet (1852)

His 1858 painting The Crossing Sweeper has been described as breaking "new ground in its description of the collision of wealth and poverty on a London street."

Later in his career he painted two series of five pictures each, telling moral stories in the manner of William Hogarth. These were the Road to Ruin (1878), about the dangers of gambling, and the Race for Wealth (1880) about reckless financial speculation. He retired from the Royal Academy in 1890 but continued to exhibit until 1902.

Frith was a traditionalist who made known his aversion to modern-art developments in a couple of autobiographies – My Autobiography and Reminiscences (1887) and Further Reminiscences (1888) – and other writings. He was also an inveterate enemy of the Pre-Raphaelites and of the Aesthetic Movement, which he satirised in his painting A Private View at the Royal Academy (1883; Private collection), in which Oscar Wilde is depicted discoursing on art while Frith's friends look on disapprovingly. Fellow traditionalist Frederic Leighton is featured in the painting, which also portrays painter John Everett Millais and novelist Anthony Trollope.

In his later years, he painted many copies of his famous paintings, as well as more sexually uninhibited works, such as the nude After the Bath. A well-known raconteur, his writings, most notably his chatty autobiography, were very popular.

In 1856, Frith was photographed at "The Photographed Institute" by Robert Howlett, as part of a series of portraits of "fine artists". The picture was among a group exhibited at the Art Treasures Exhibition in Manchester in 1857.

Frith died in 1909 aged 90 and is buried in Kensal Green Cemetery in London.

=== Exhibitions and legacy ===
The first major retrospective in Frith's native Britain for half a century was staged at the Guildhall Art Gallery, London in November 2006. It transferred to Mercer Art Gallery in Harrogate, North Yorkshire, in March 2007. Frith's study for his last major work, The Private View, 1881, is in the Mercer Art Gallery. His work was also shown at the Whitechapel Gallery in London during an exhibition running from 25 October – 1 December 1951. Frith has paintings in the collection of several British institutions including Derby Art Gallery, Sheffield, Harrogate and the Victoria and Albert Museum.

== Personal life ==
Frith was married twice. He had twelve children with his first wife, Isabelle, whilst a mile down the road maintaining a mistress (Mary Alford, formerly his ward) and seven more children – all a marked contrast to the upright family scenes depicted in paintings like Many Happy Returns of the Day. Frith married Alford a year after the death of Isabelle in 1880. A daughter from his first family, Jane Ellen Panton, published Leaves of a life in 1908. It is a book of childhood reminiscences describing her father and the family's set of artist and literary friendships, chiefly members of The Clique. Walter Frith, the third son from Frith's first marriage, was the author of fourteen plays and three novels.

== Gallery ==
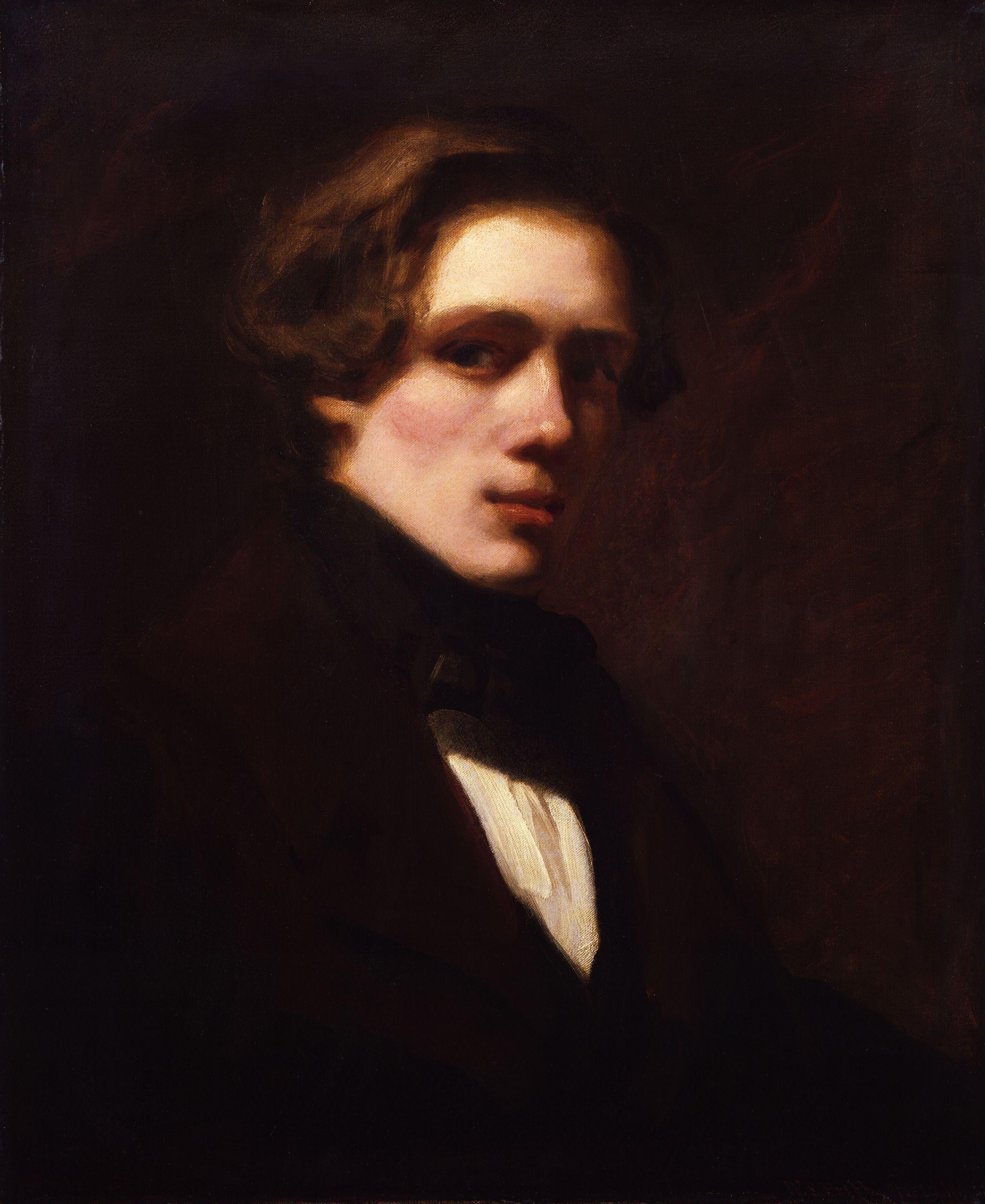
Self-Portrait, 1838

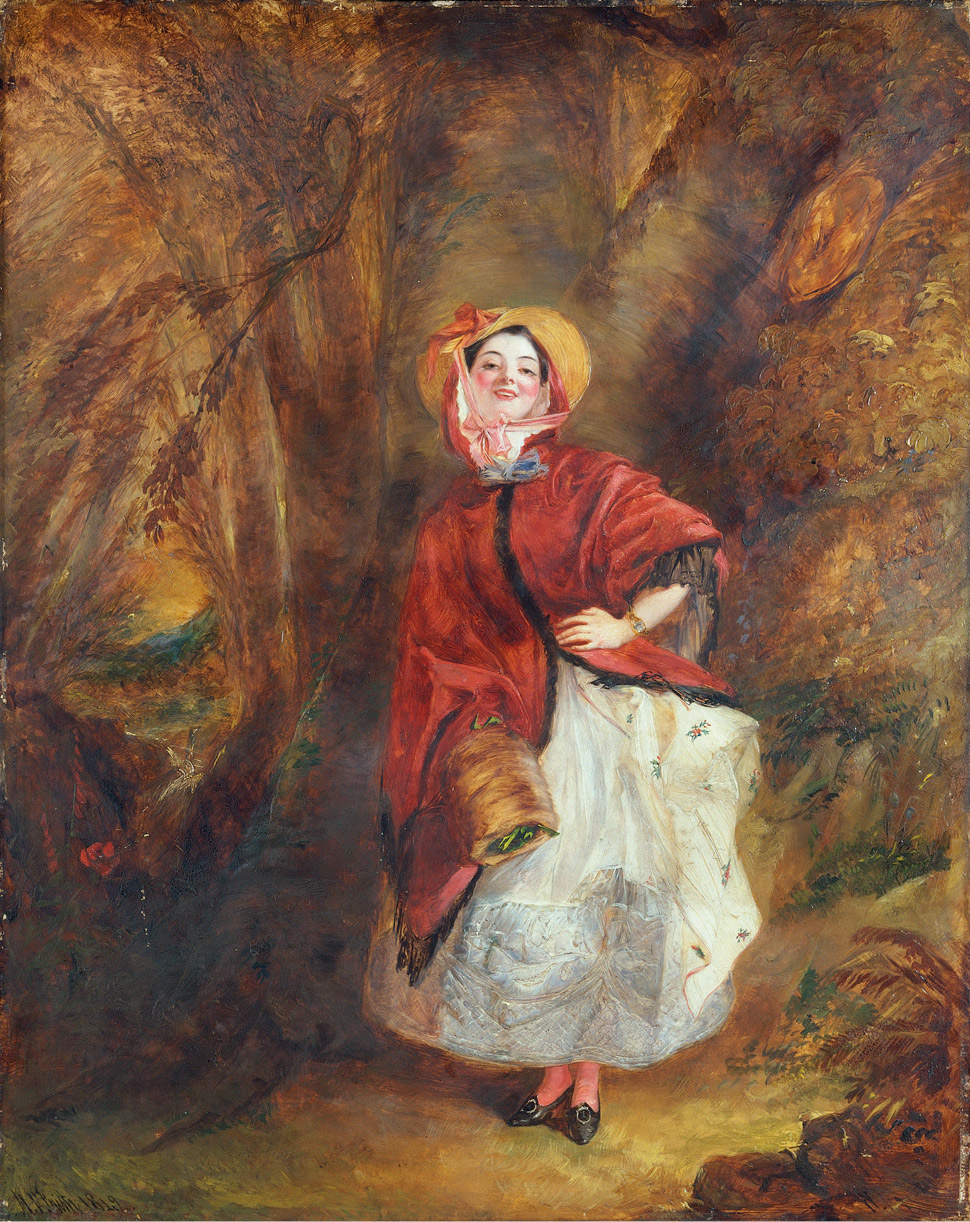
Dolly Varden, 1842

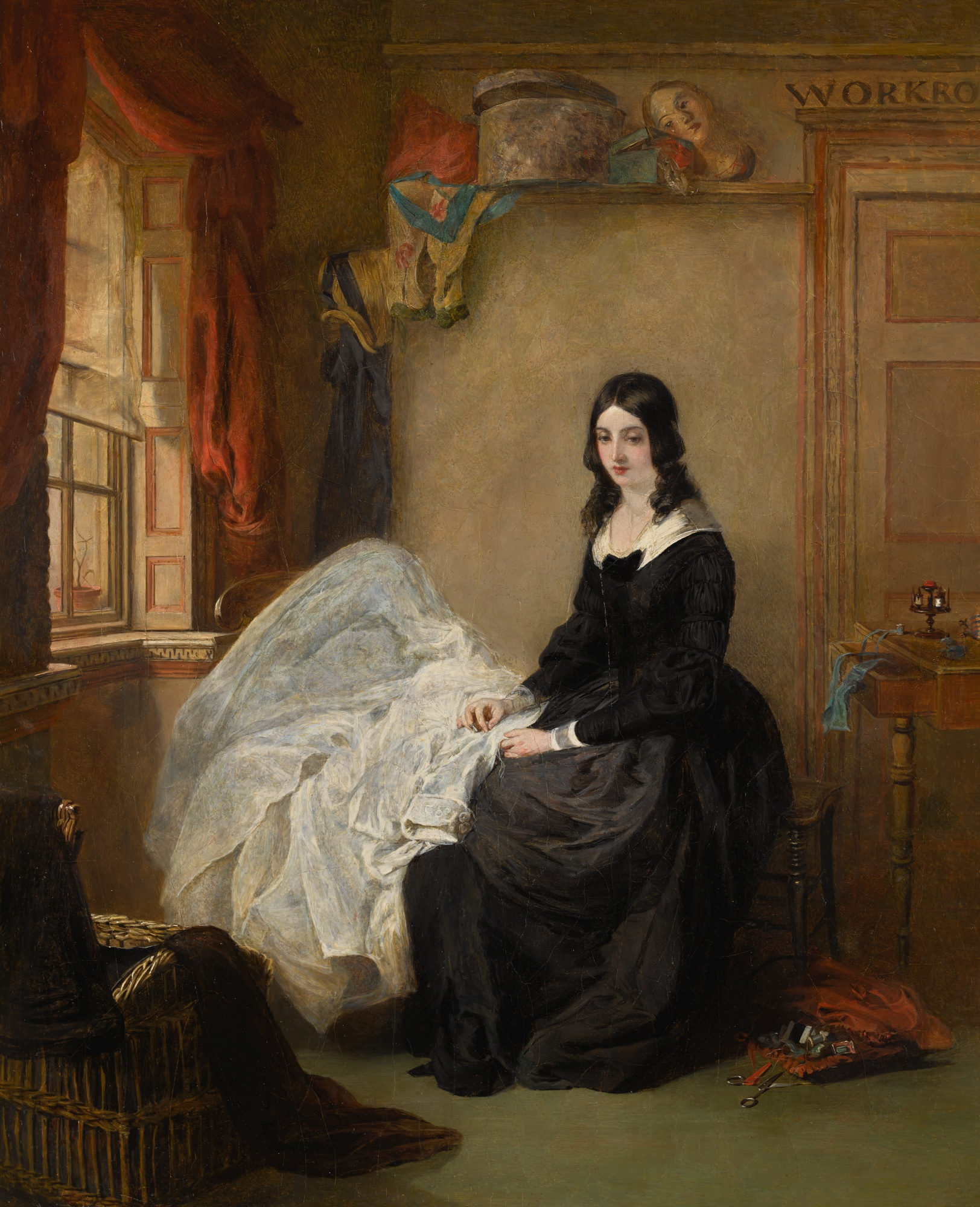
Kate Nickleby at Madame Mantalini's, 1842

Measuring Heights, 1842

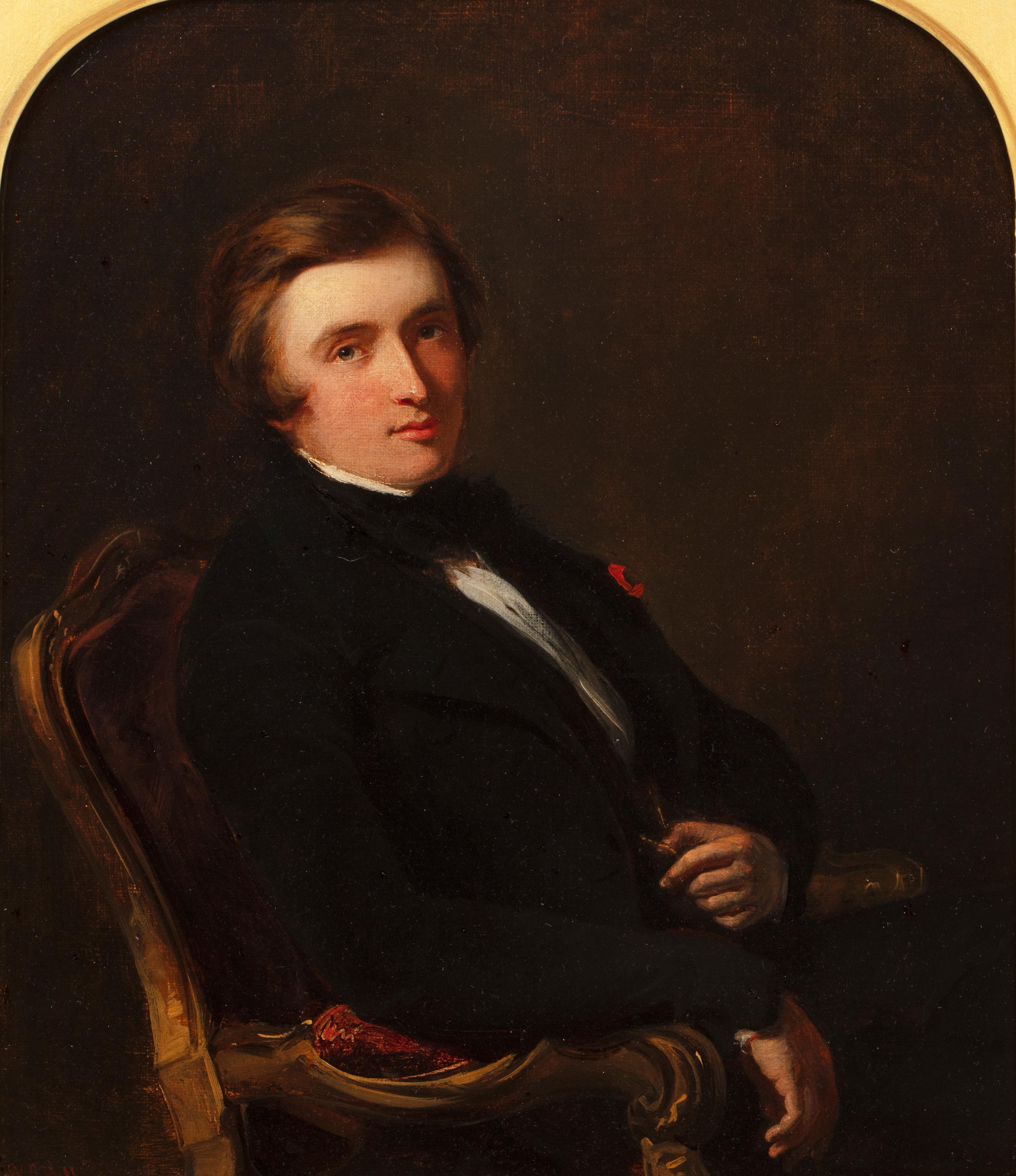
Portrait of John Ruskin, 1843

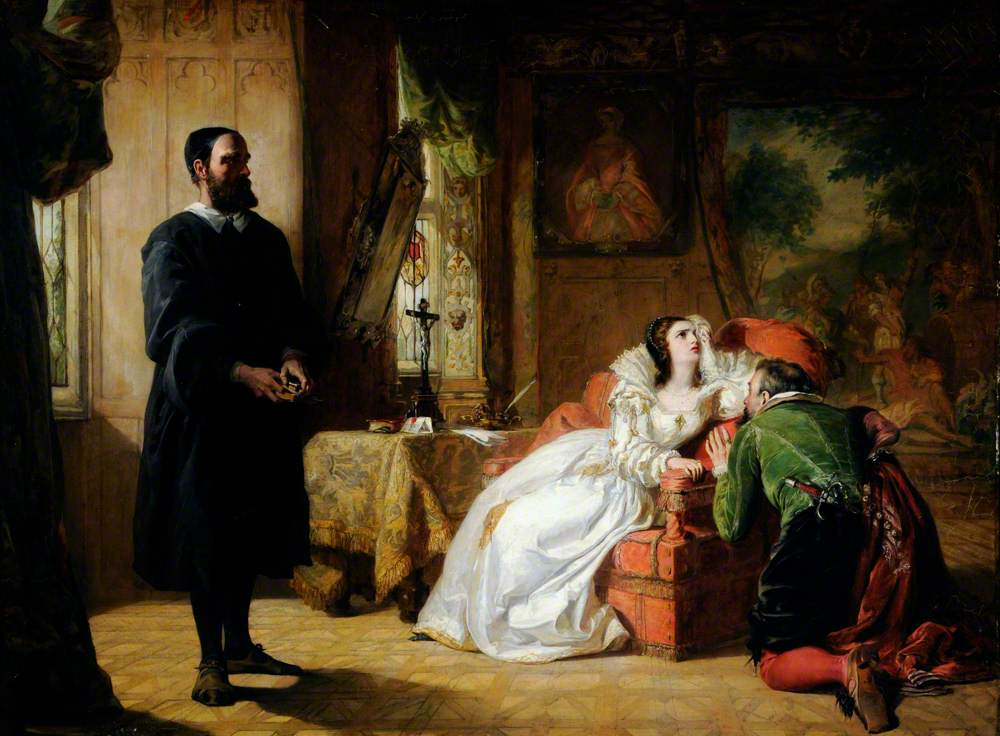
John Knox Reproving Mary, Queen of Scots, 1844

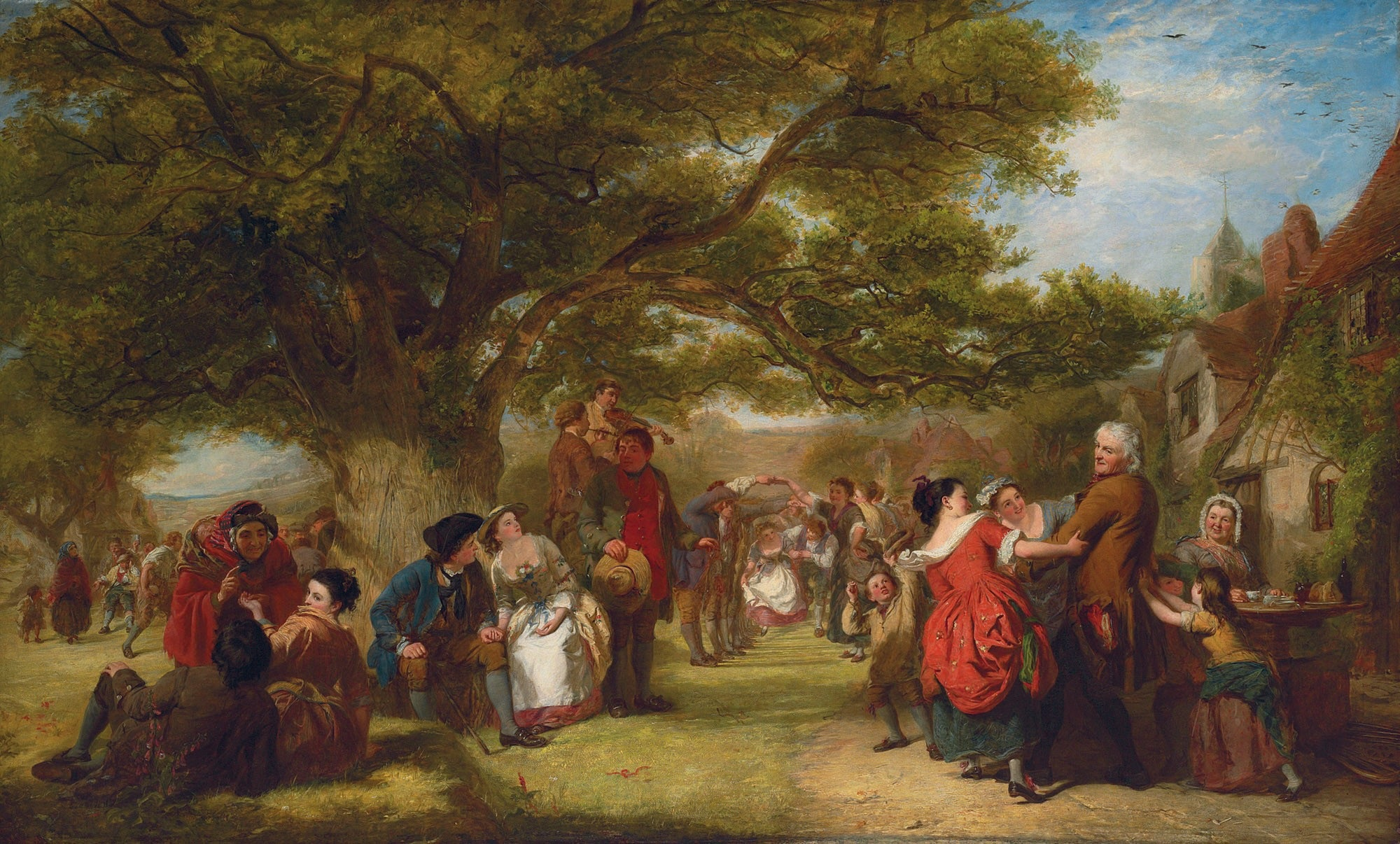
An English Merrymaking a Hundred Years Ago, 1847

Coming of Age, 1849

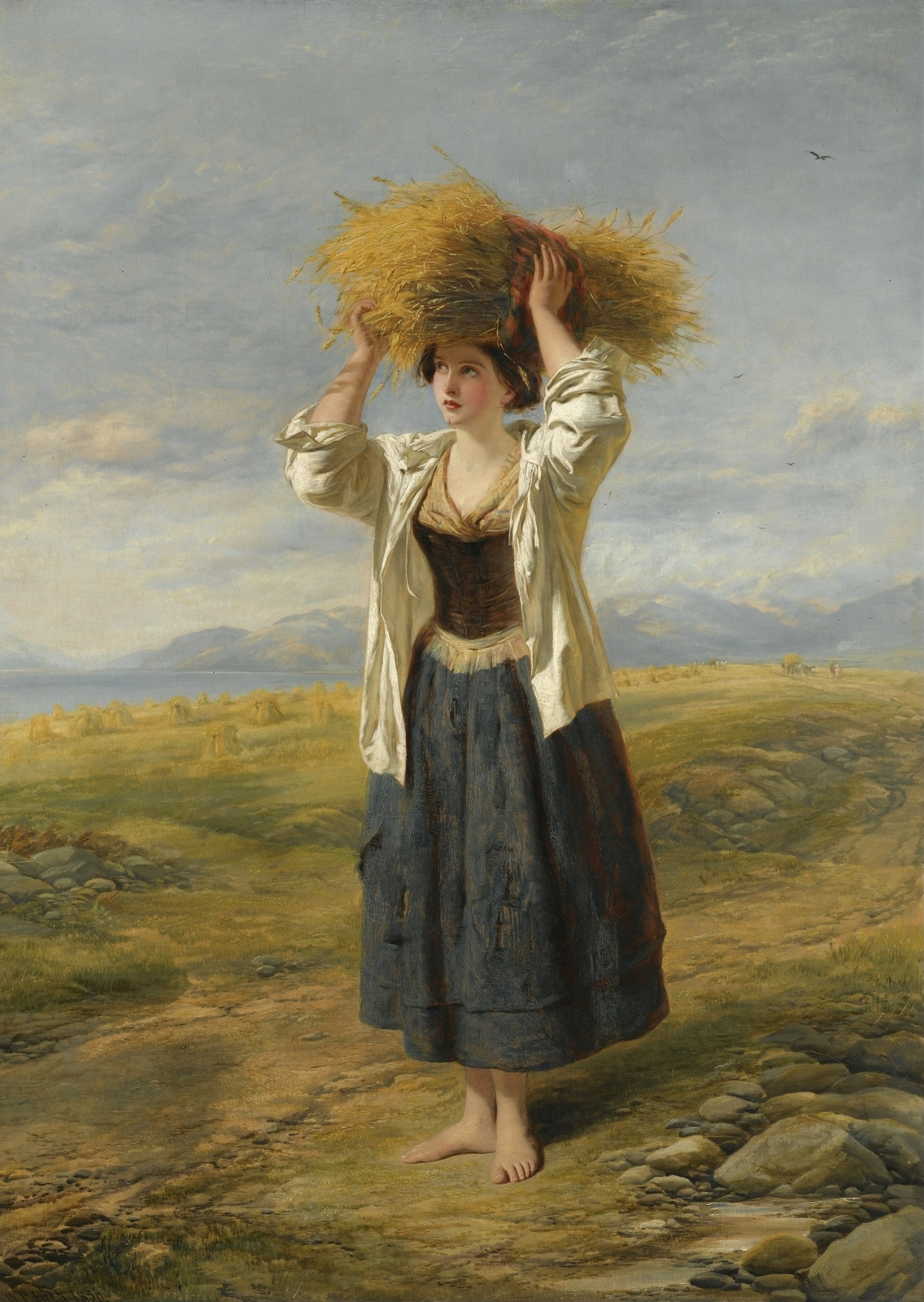
The Little Gleaner, c.1850

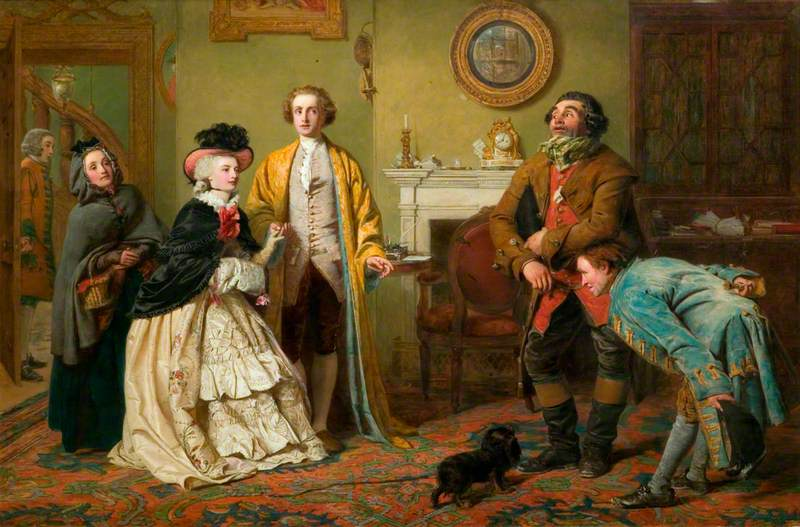
Mr Honeywood Introduces the Bailiffs to Miss Richland as His Friends, 1850

Hogarth Brought Before the Governor of Calais as a Spy 1851

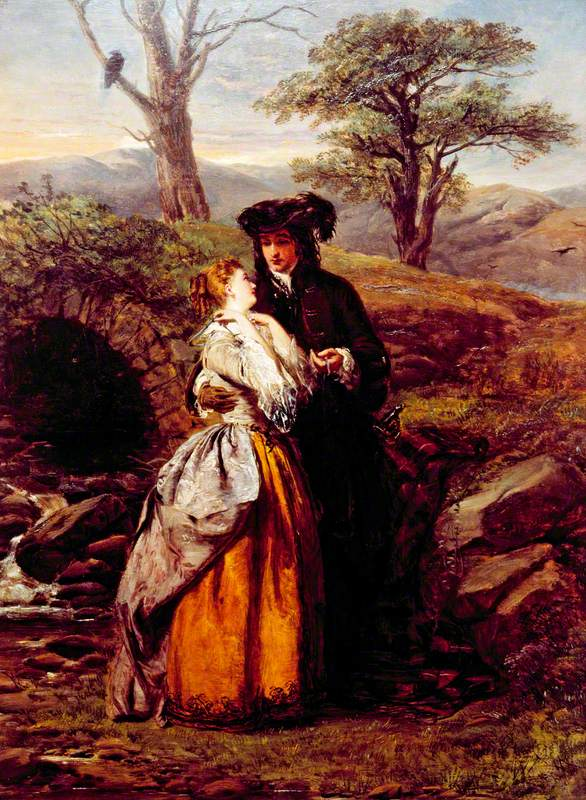
The Bride of Lammermoor, 1852

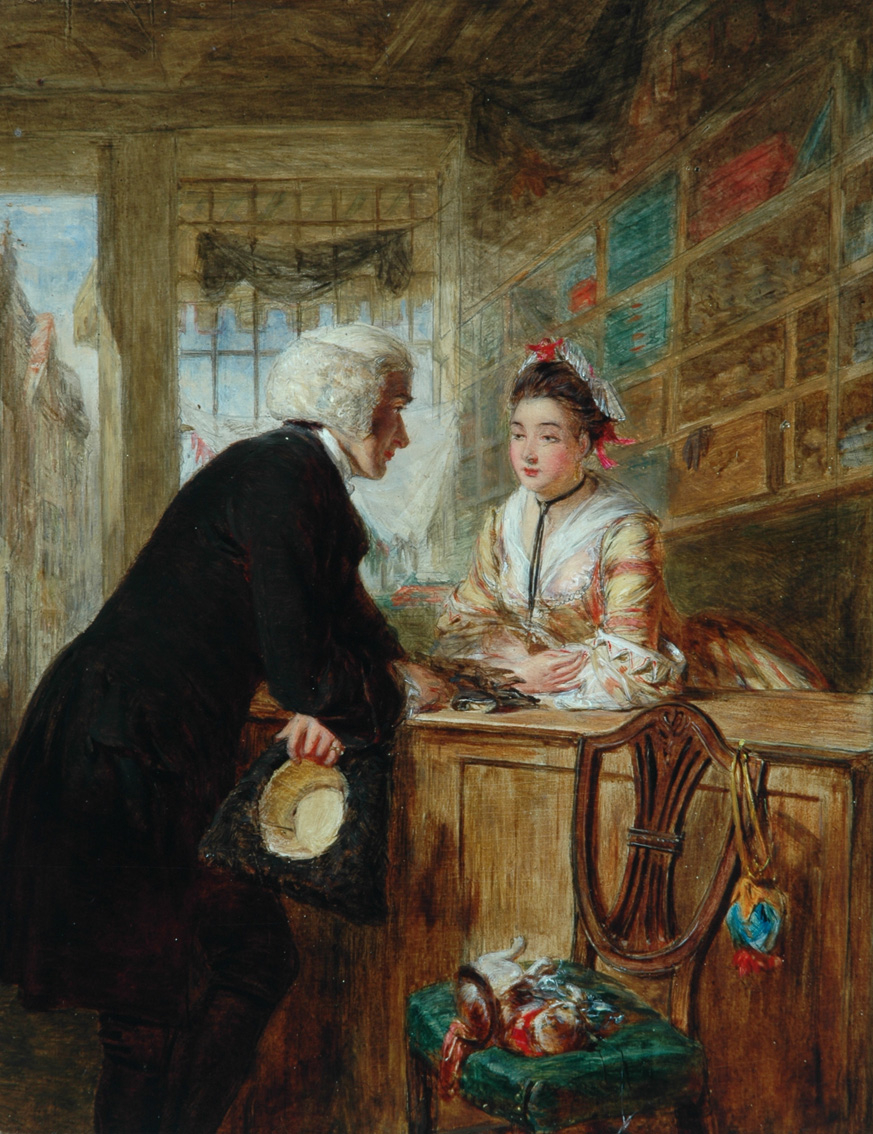
The Beautiful Grisette, 1853. A scene from Laurence Sterne's A Sentimental Journey Through France and Italy

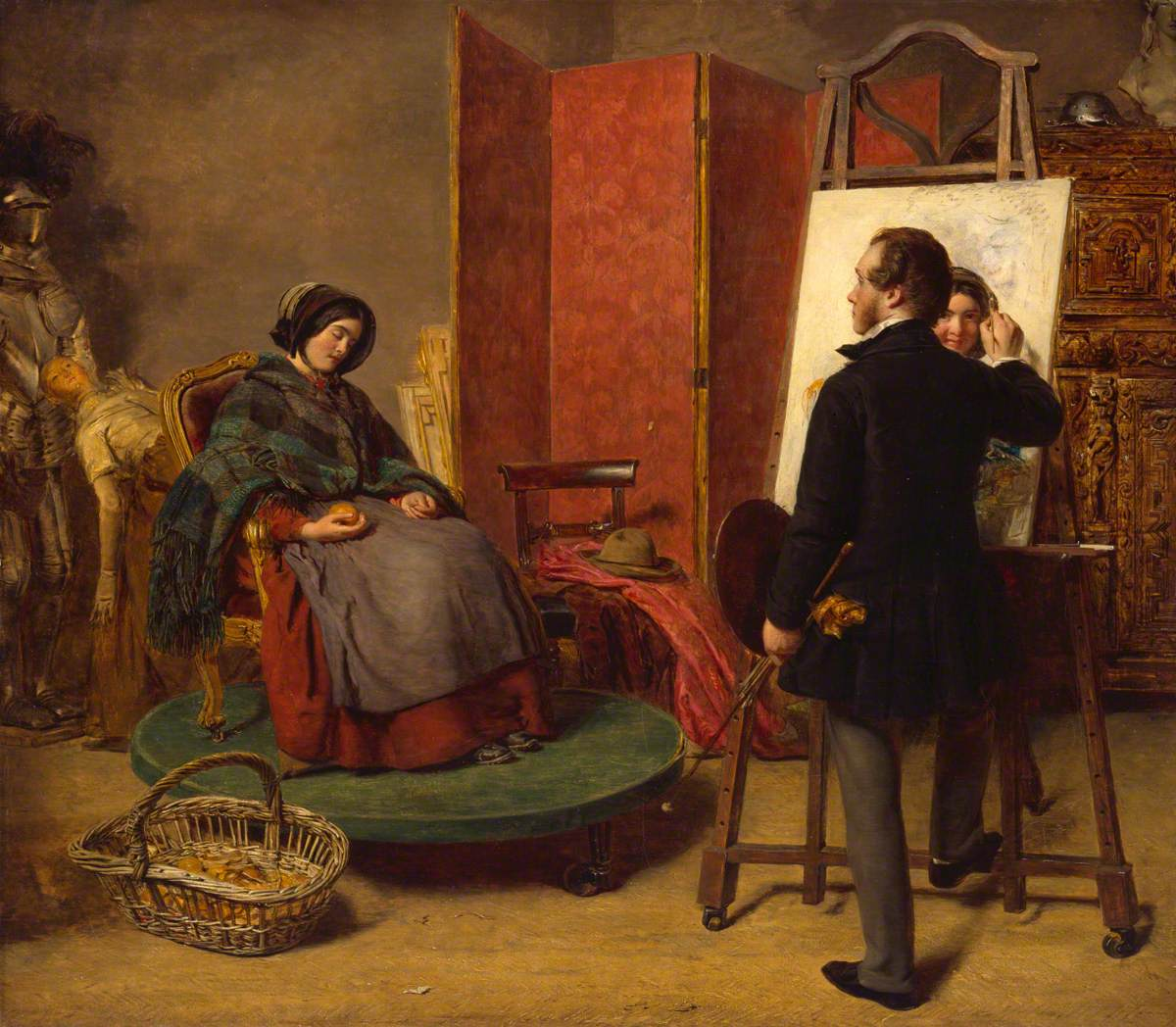
The Sleeping Model, 1853

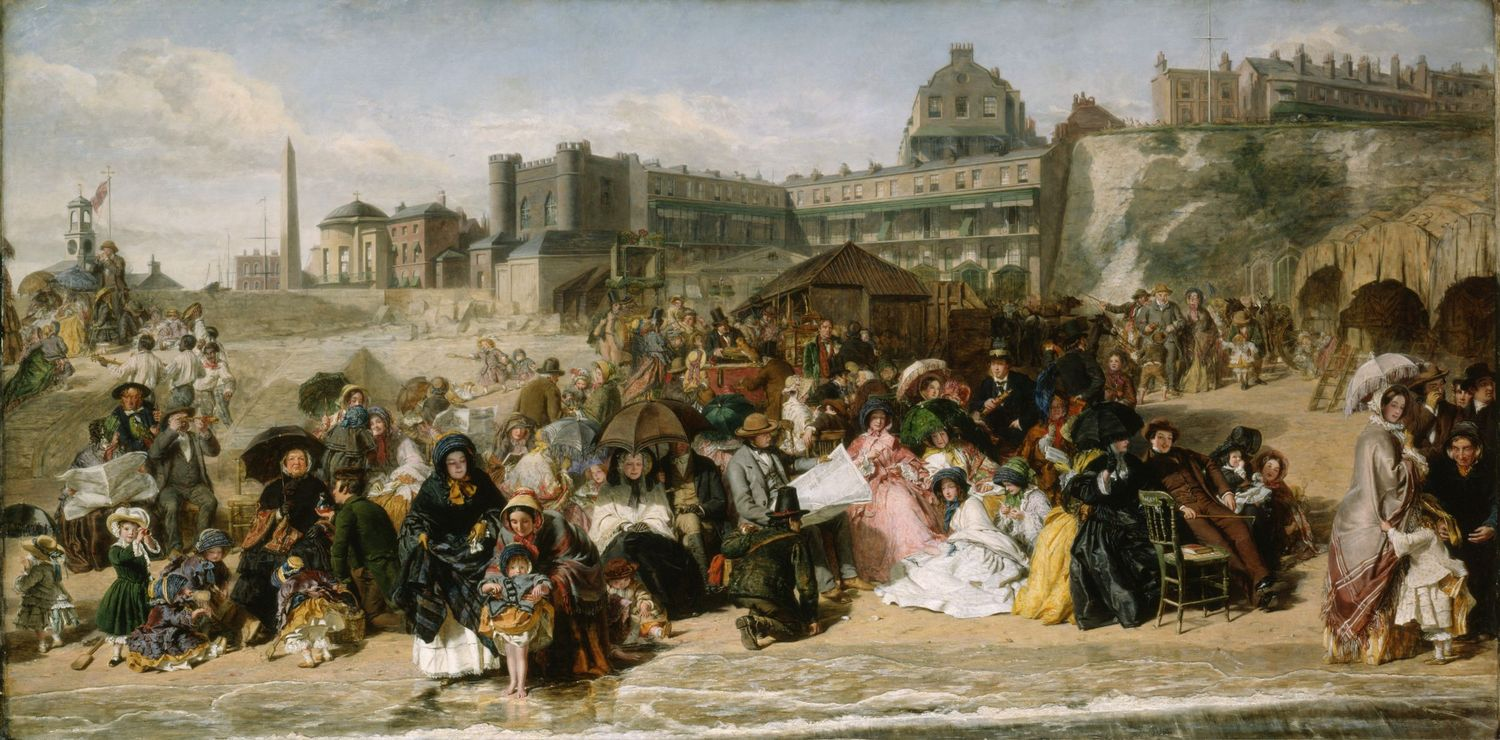
Ramsgate Sands, 1854

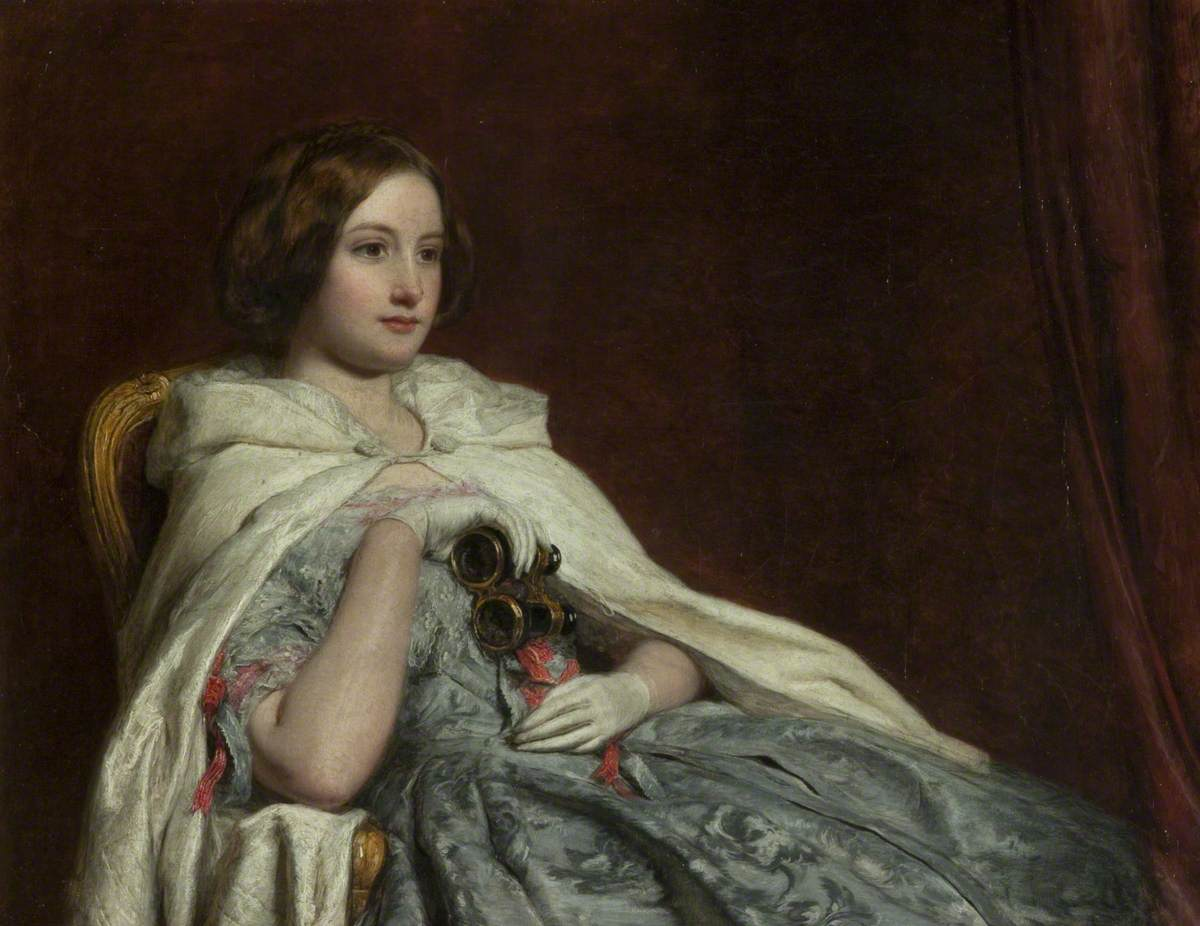
At the Opera, 1855

Kate Nickleby at Madame Mantalini's, 1856

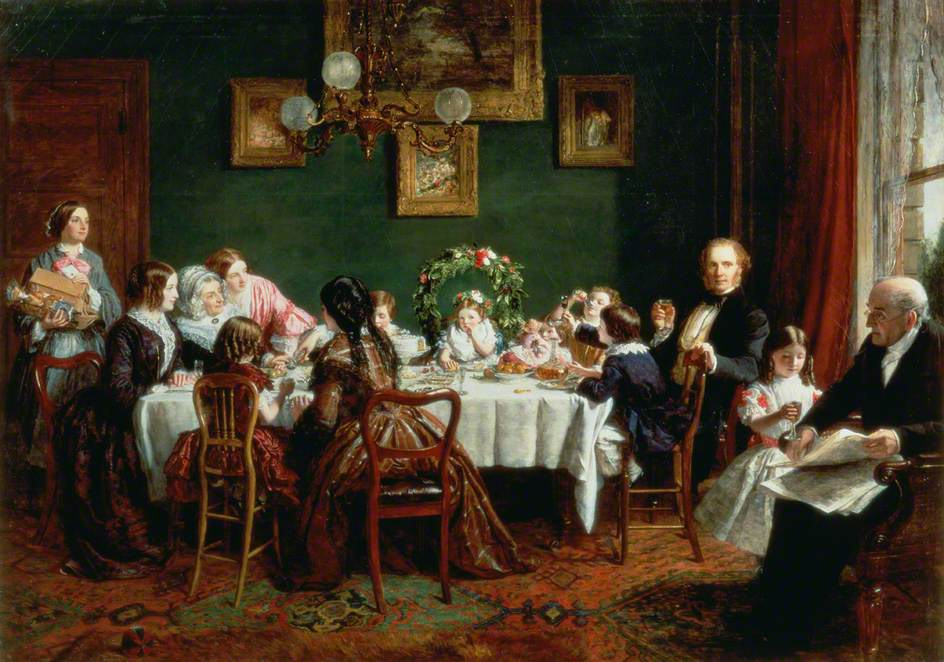
Many Happy Returns of the Day, 1856

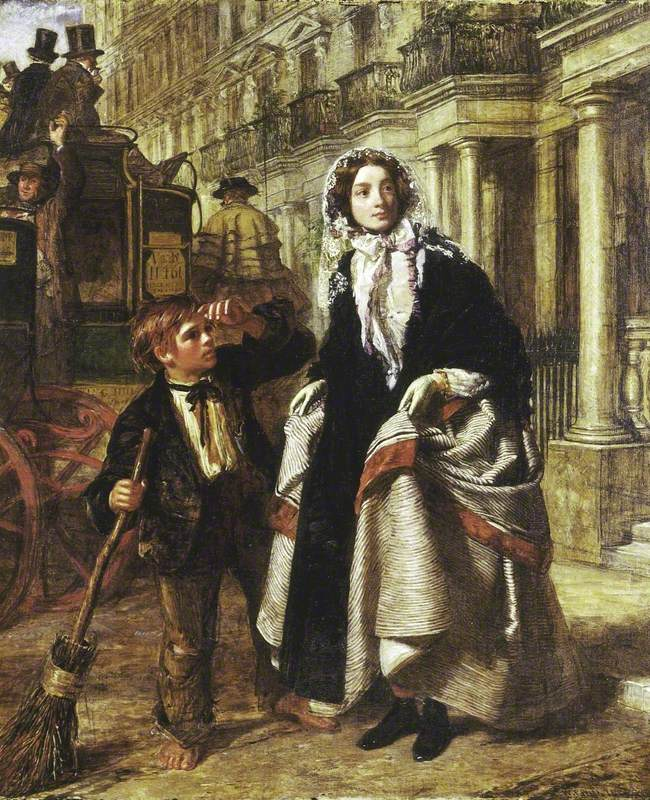
The Crossing Sweeper, 1858

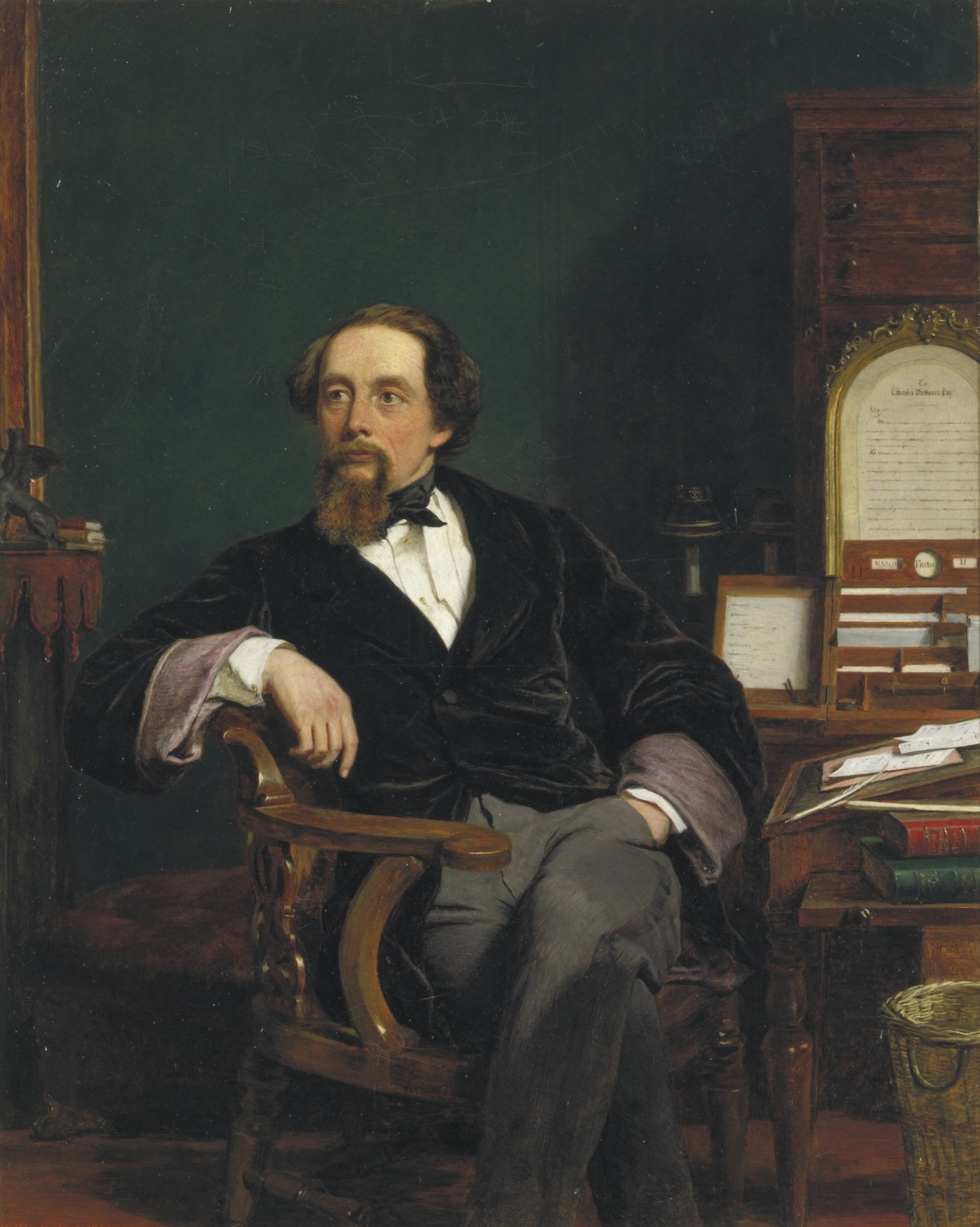
Charles Dickens in His Study, 1859

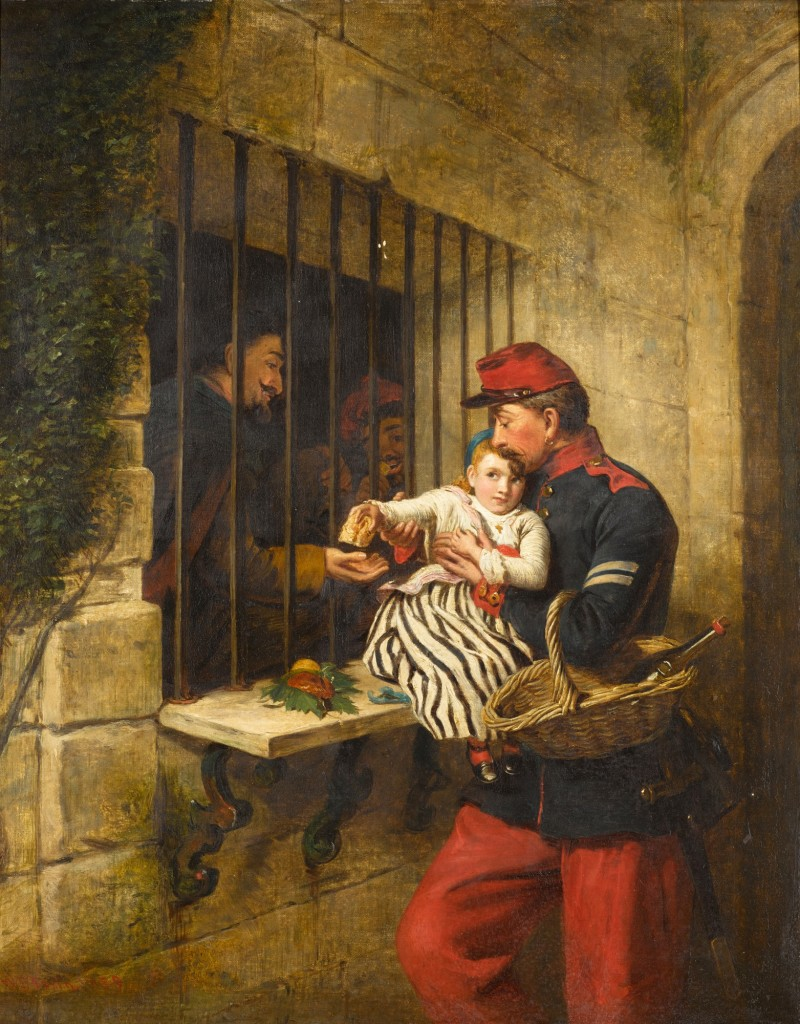
Interior of Marseilles Prison, Little Dorrit, 1859

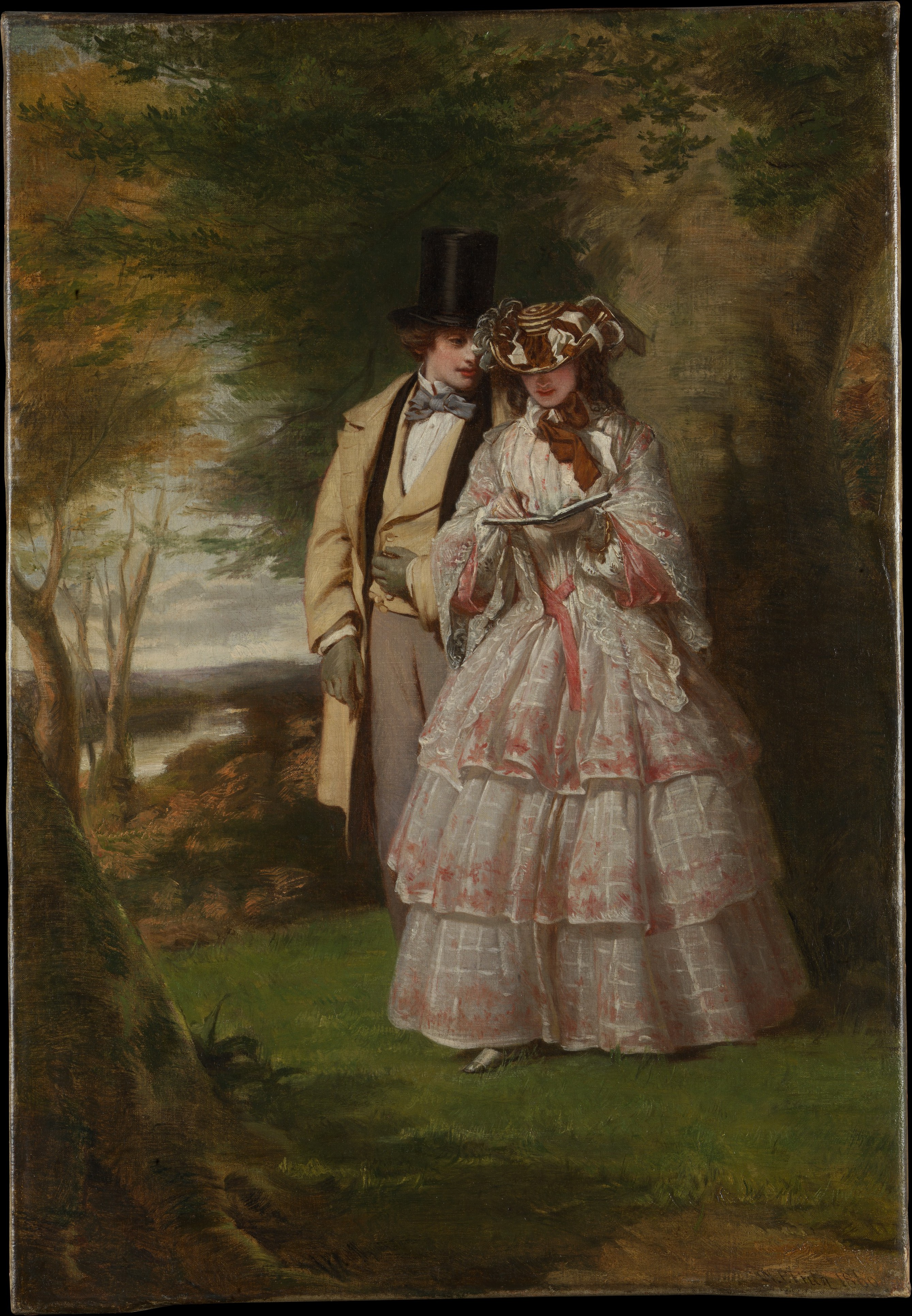
The Two Central Figures in "Derby Day", at the Metropolitan Museum of Art, 1860

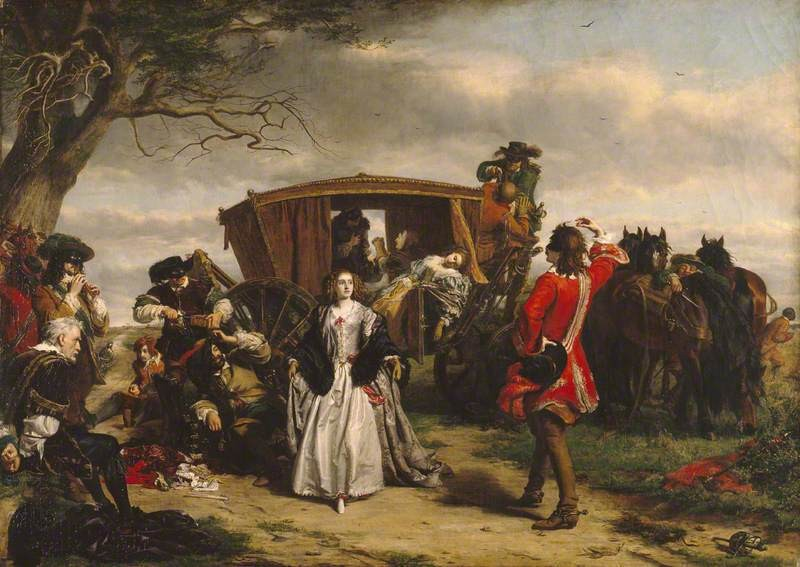
Claude Duval, 1860

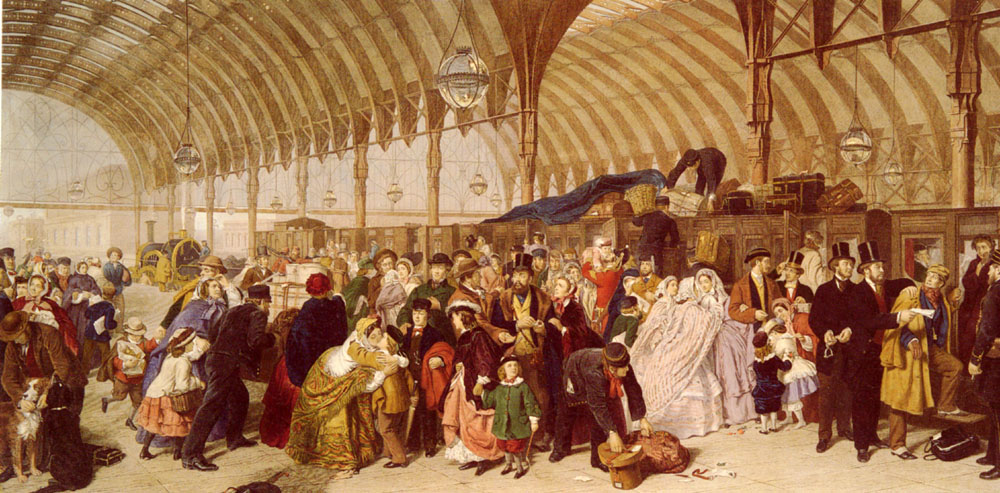
The Railway Station, 1862. Depiction of Paddington railway station.

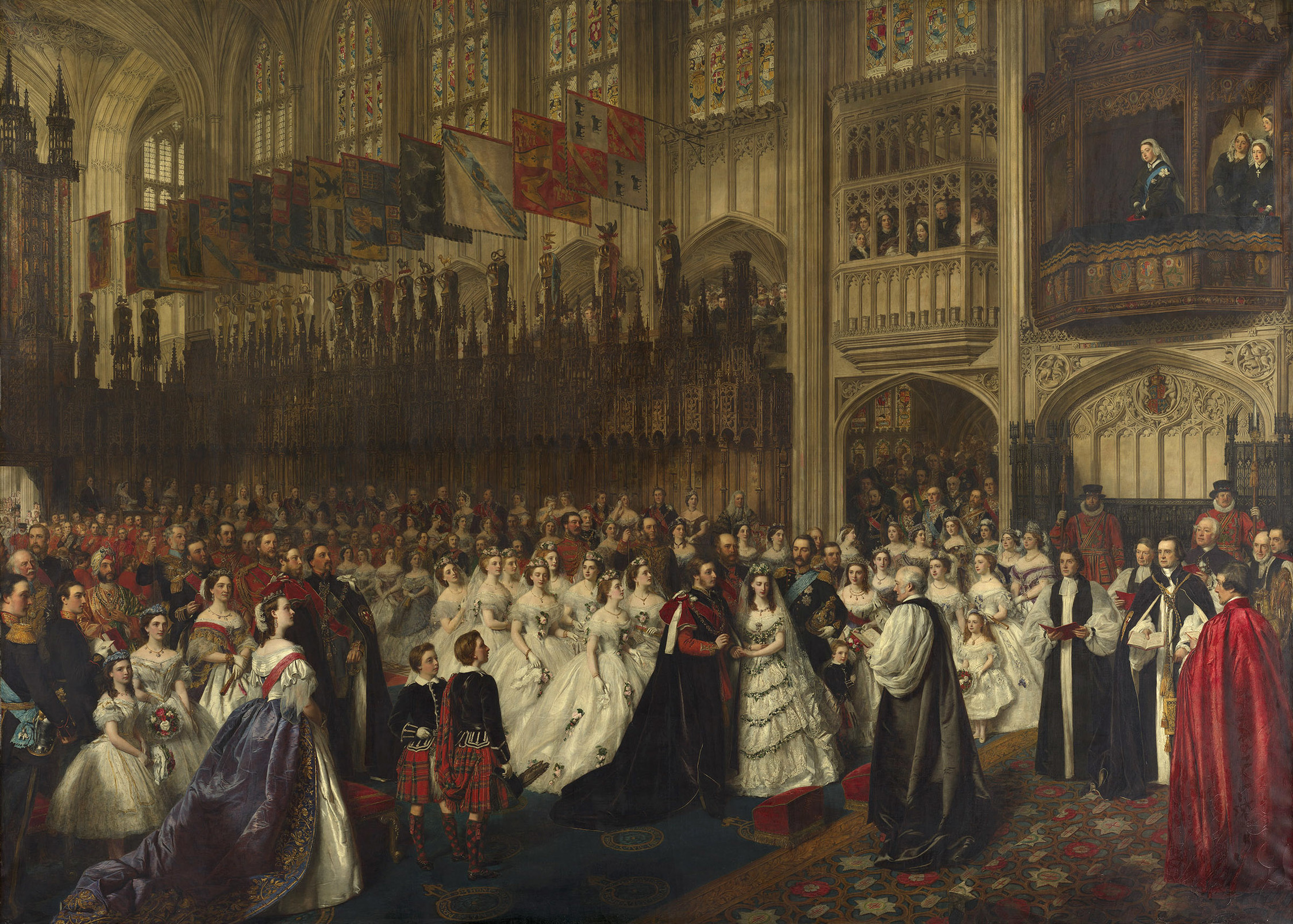
The Marriage of the Prince of Wales, 1865. Depiction of the Wedding of Prince Albert Edward and Princess Alexandra

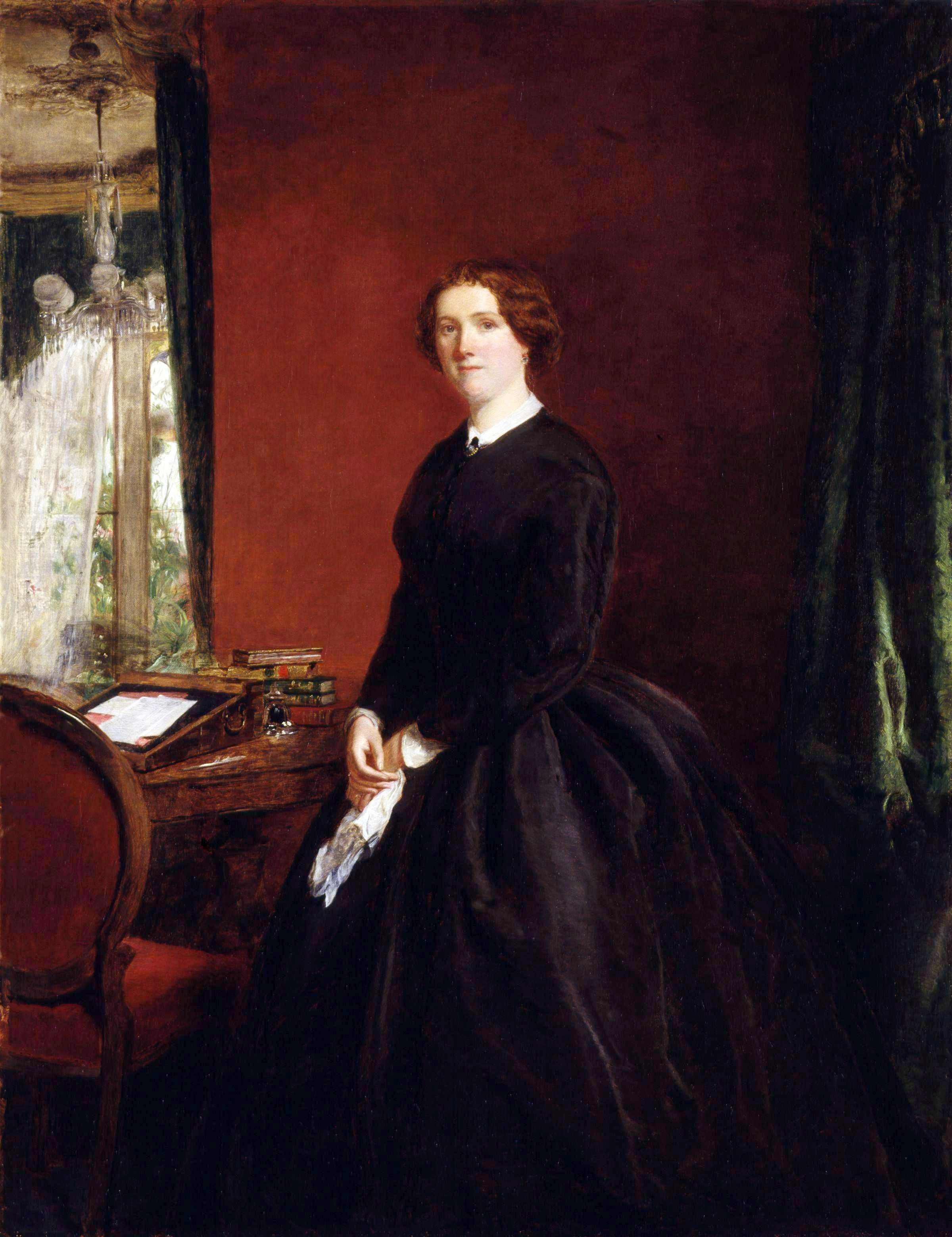
Portrait of Mary Elizabeth Braddon, 1865

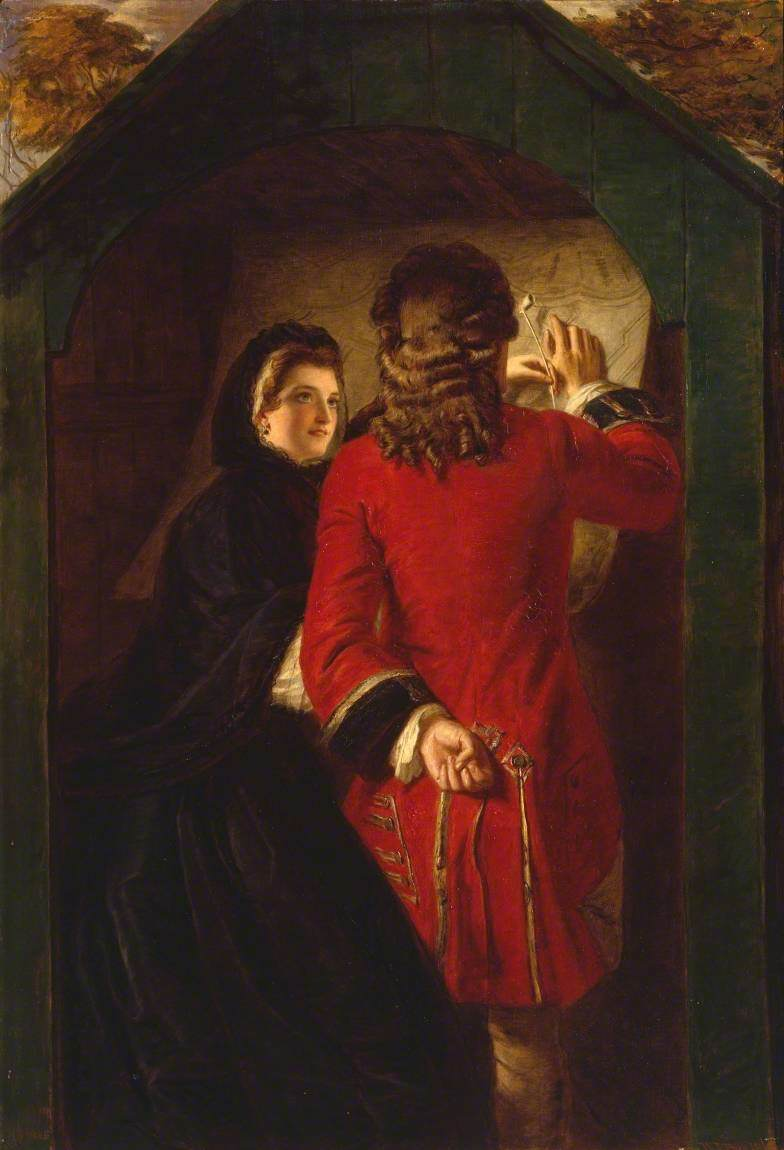
Uncle Toby and the Widow Wadman, 1865

Nell Gwynn, 1869

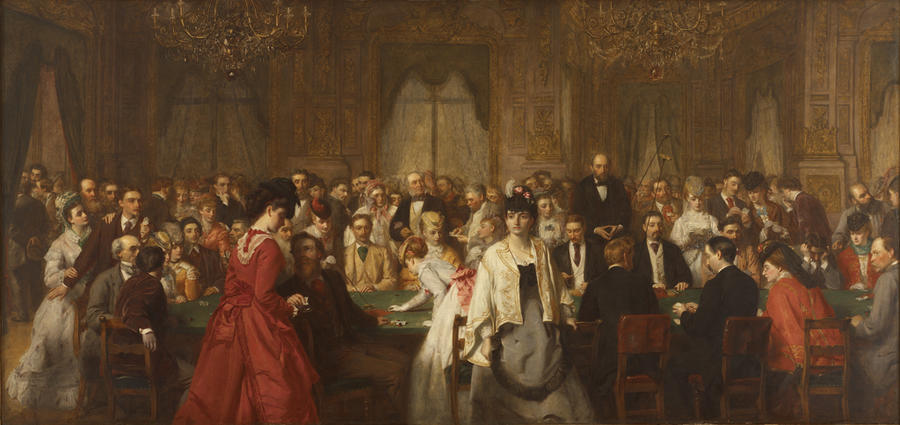
Salon d'Or, Homburg, 1871

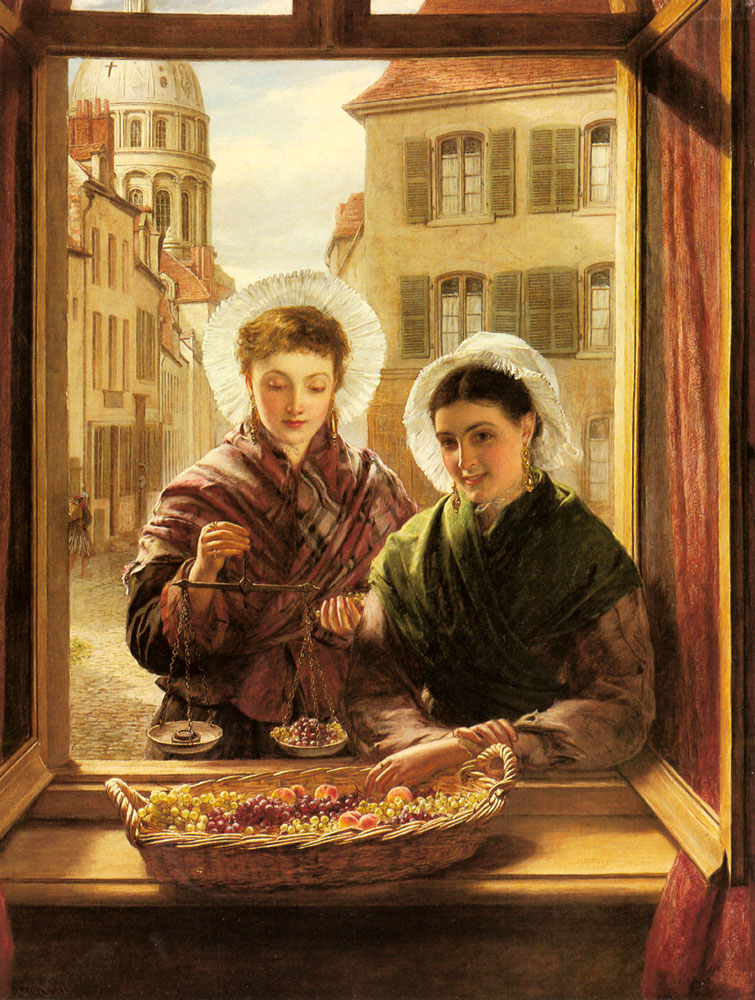
At My Window, Boulogne, 1871

Henry VIII and Anne Boleyn Deer Shooting in Windsor Forest, 1872

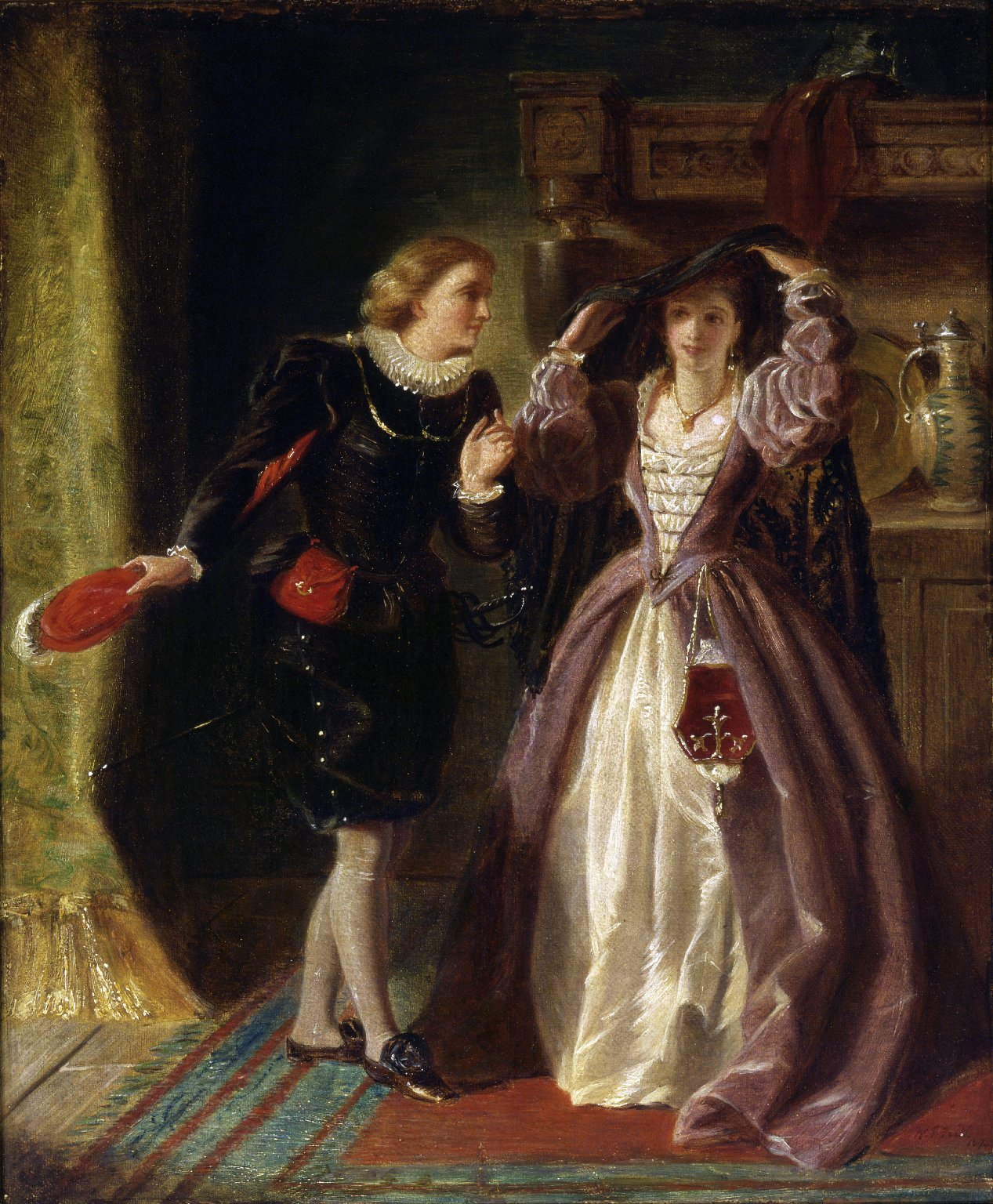
Olivia unveiling, 1874. From Act I, Scene 5 of William Shakespeare's Twelfth Night

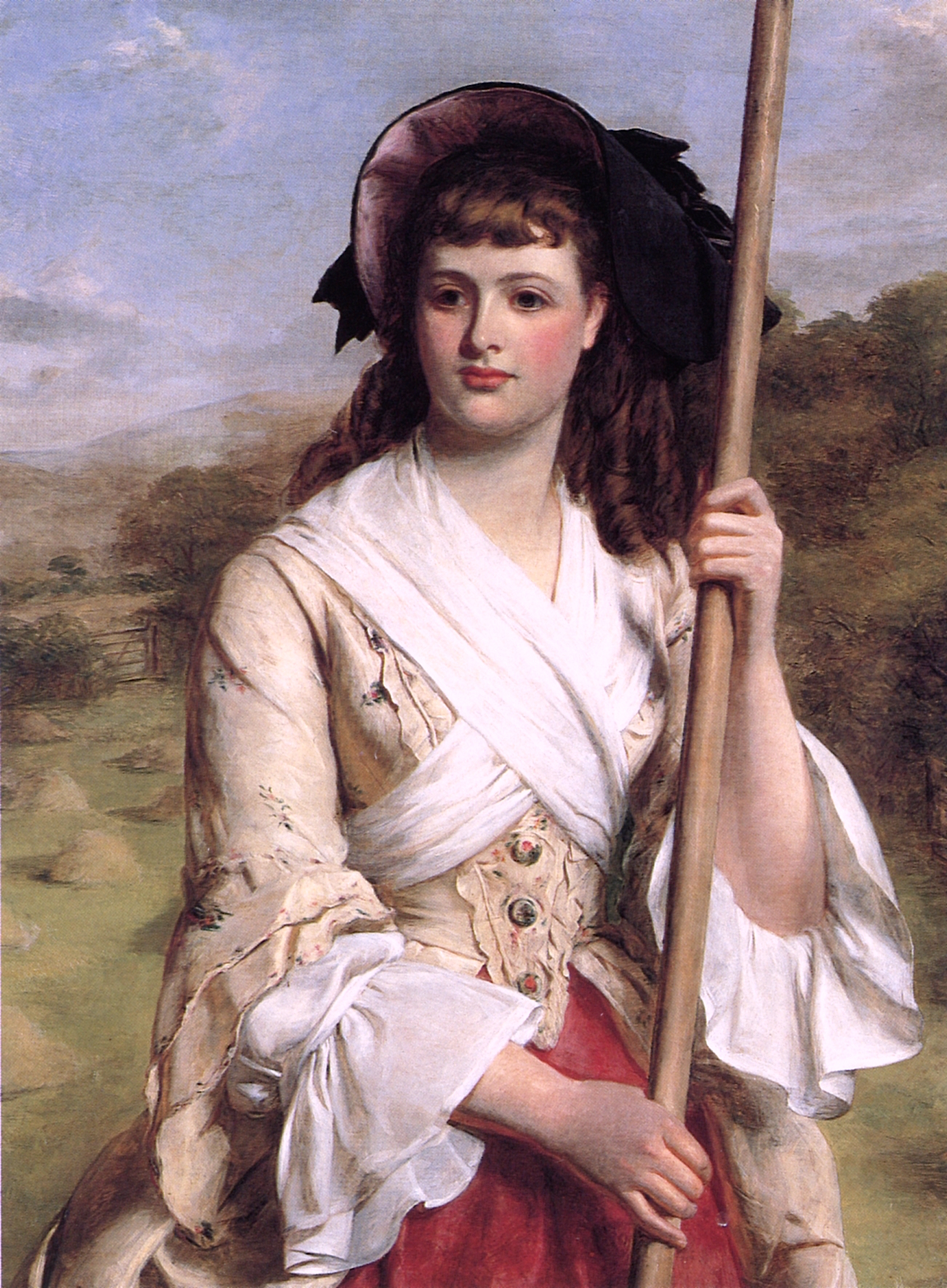
Polly Peachum, 1875

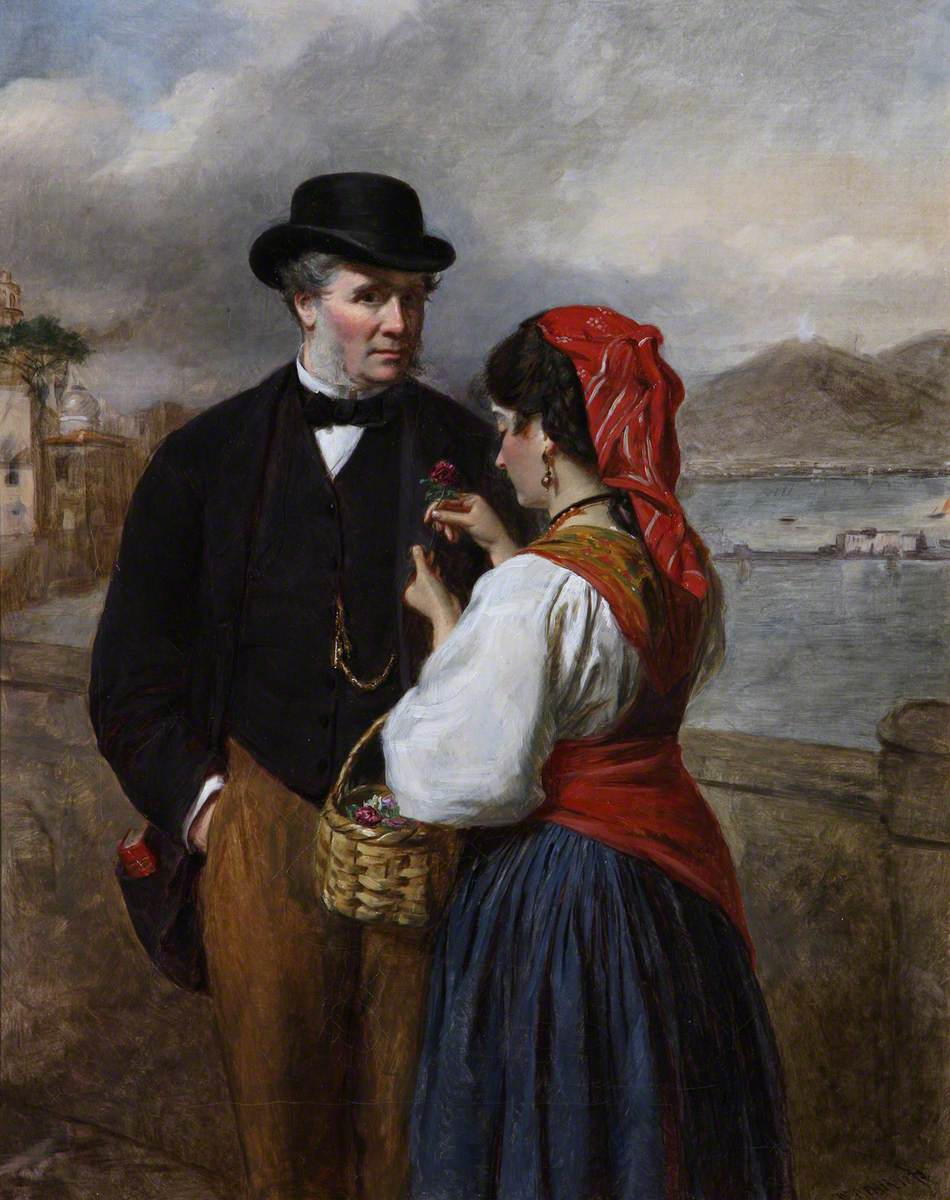
In Naples, Portrait of the Artist, 1875

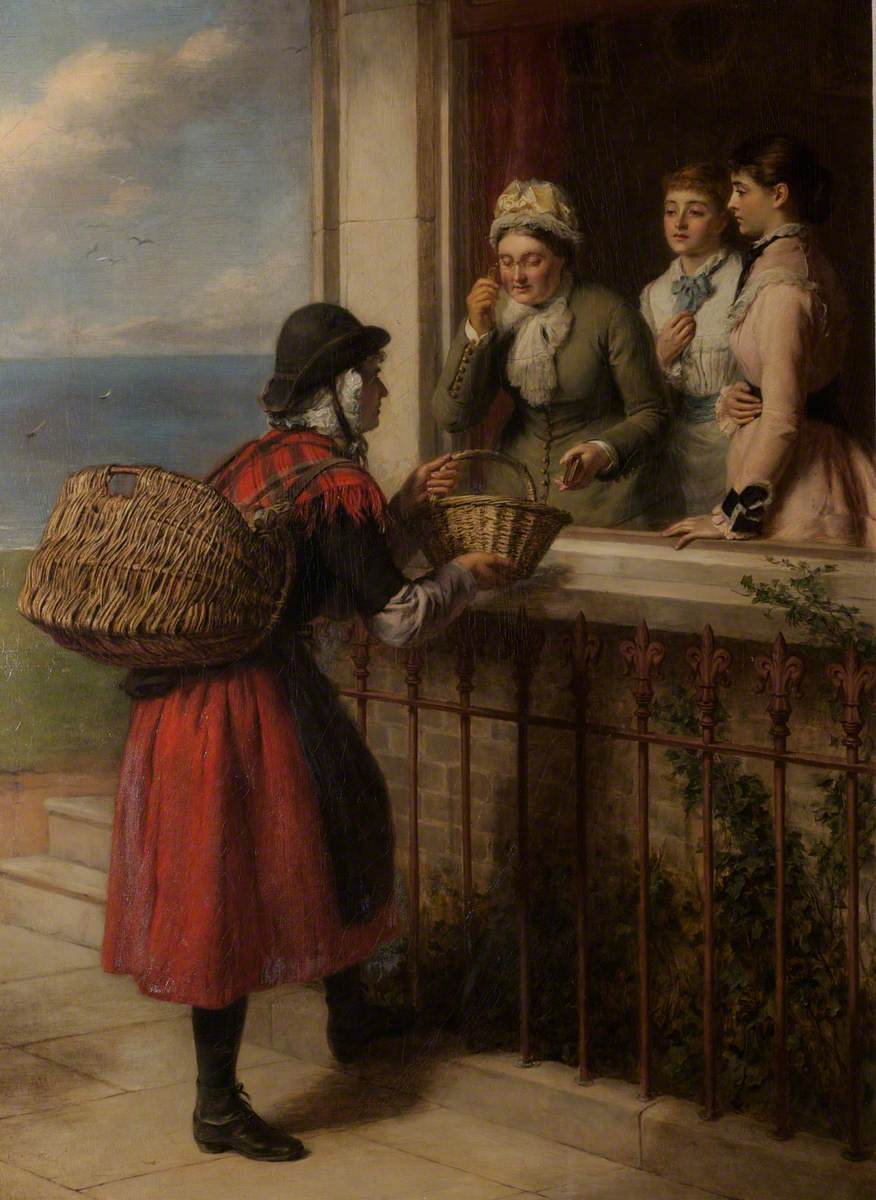
Tenby Fisherwoman, 1880

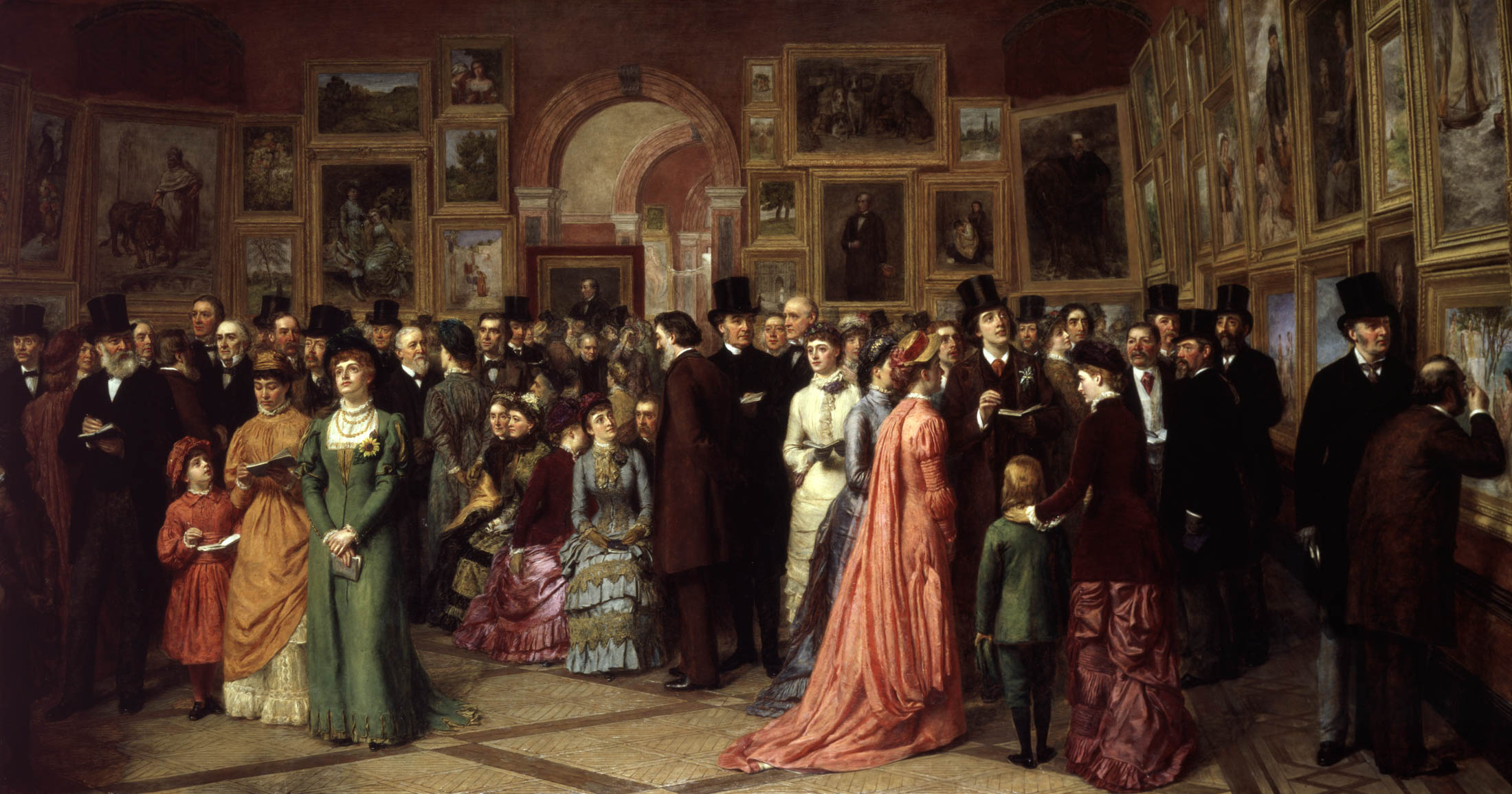
A Private View at the Royal Academy, 1881, 1883, one of Frith's "panoramas", depicting the art-world of his day at a private view, and satirising the influence of Oscar Wilde and the Aesthetic movement. Wilde is the main figure at the right, standing in front of the boy wearing green.

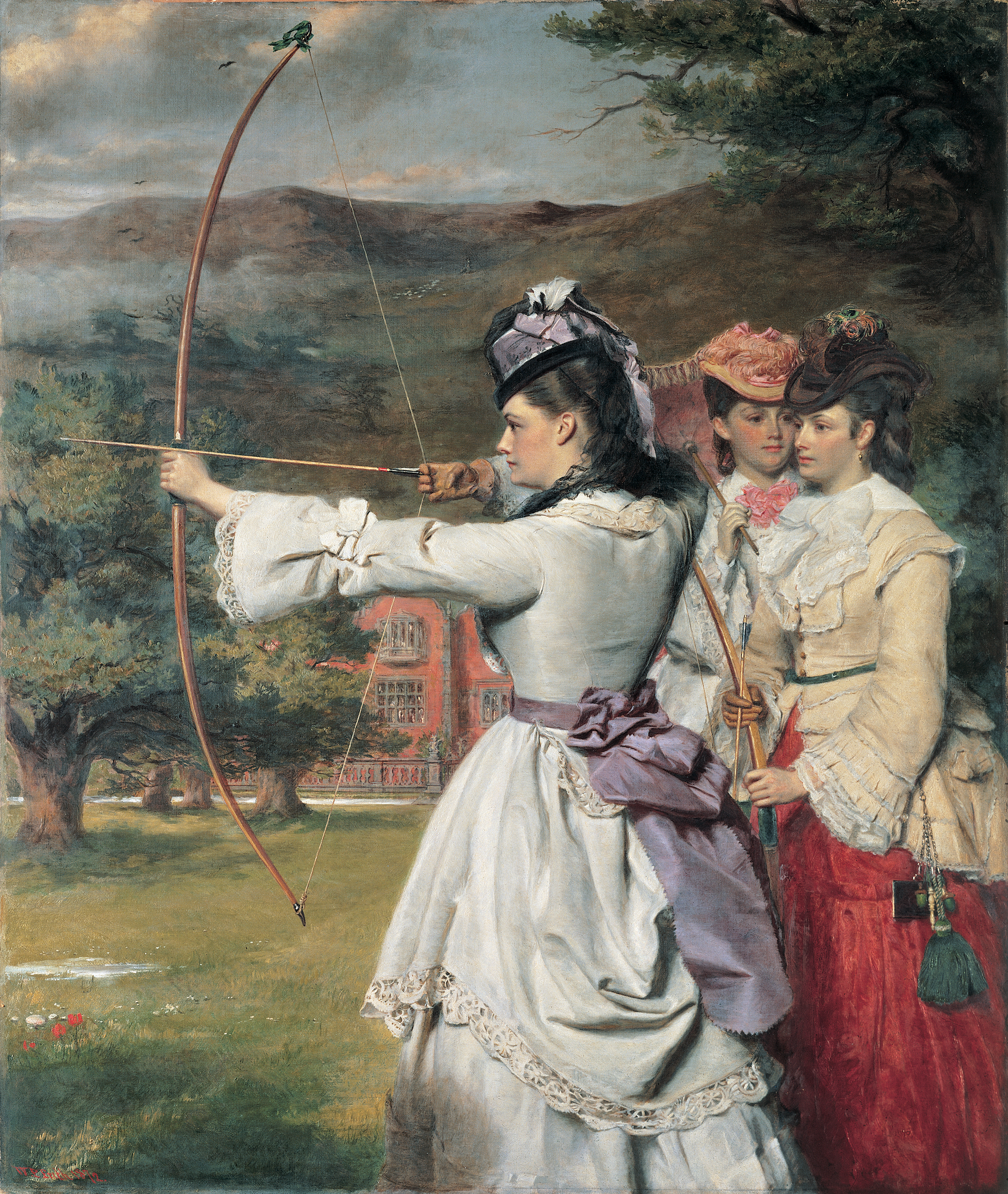
The Fair Toxophilites, 1872

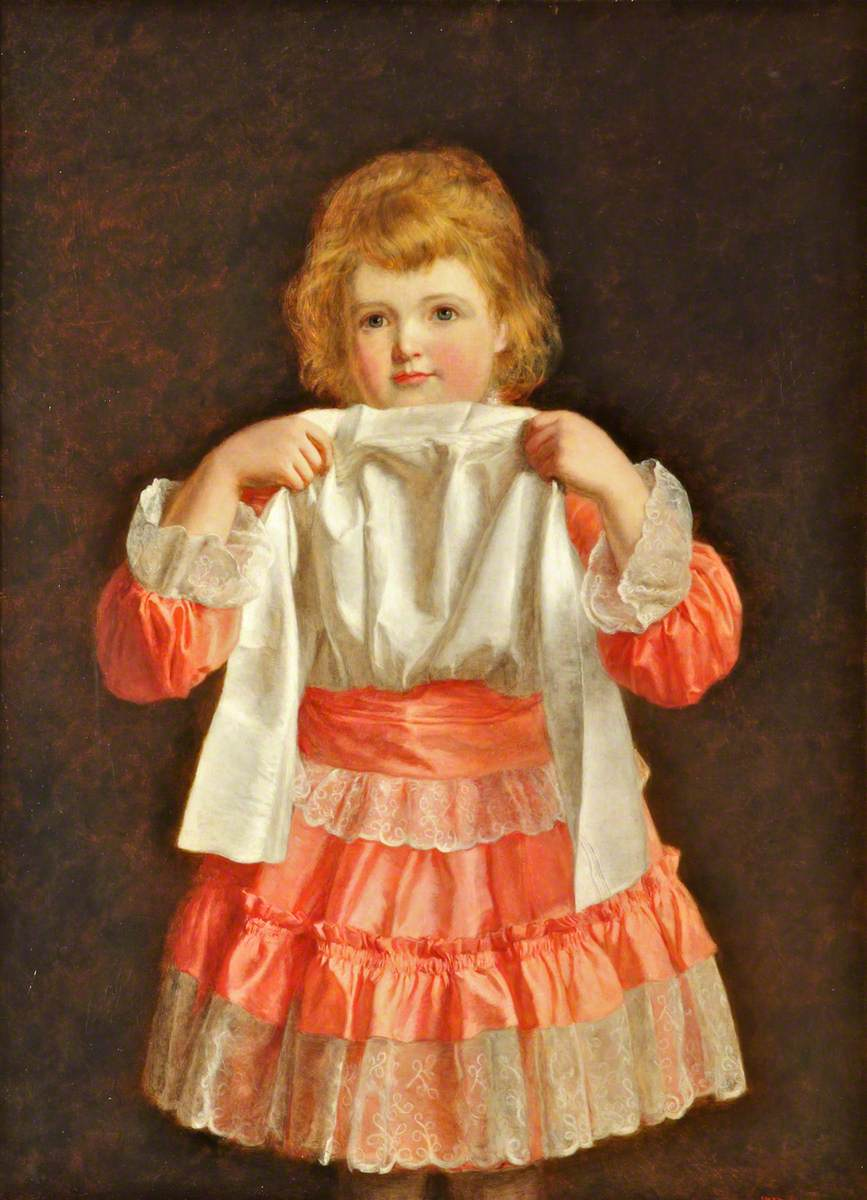
The New Frock, 1889

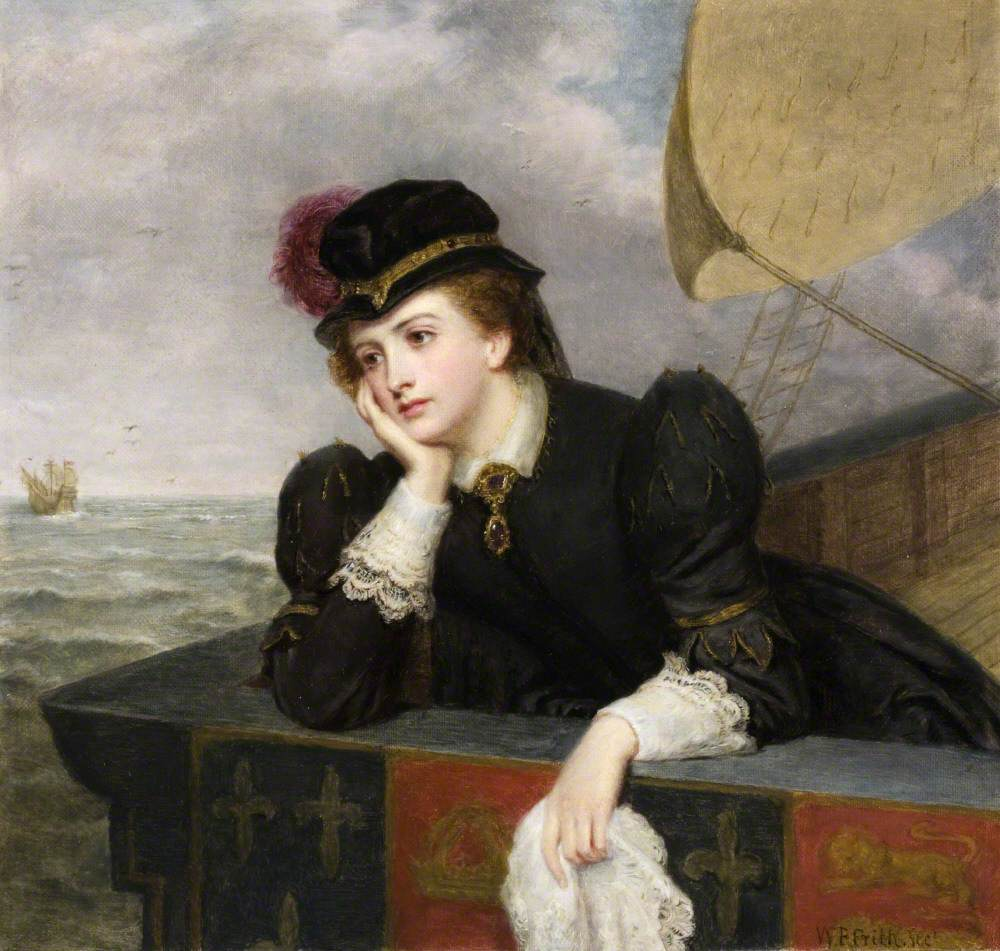
Mary, Queen of Scots Bidding Farewell to France, 1893

The New Model, 1898

== Writings ==
- My Autobiography and Reminiscences (1887). (BiblioBazaar reprint, 2009: ISBN 1-116-49774-3)
- Further Reminiscences (1888).
- John Leech, His Life and Work, 2 vols. (1891).

== References and sources ==
Citations

Sources

- Chisholm, Hugh, ed. (1911). "Frith, William Powell" . Encyclopædia Britannica (11th ed.). Cambridge University Press.
