= The Sleeping Model =

Painting by William Powell Frith

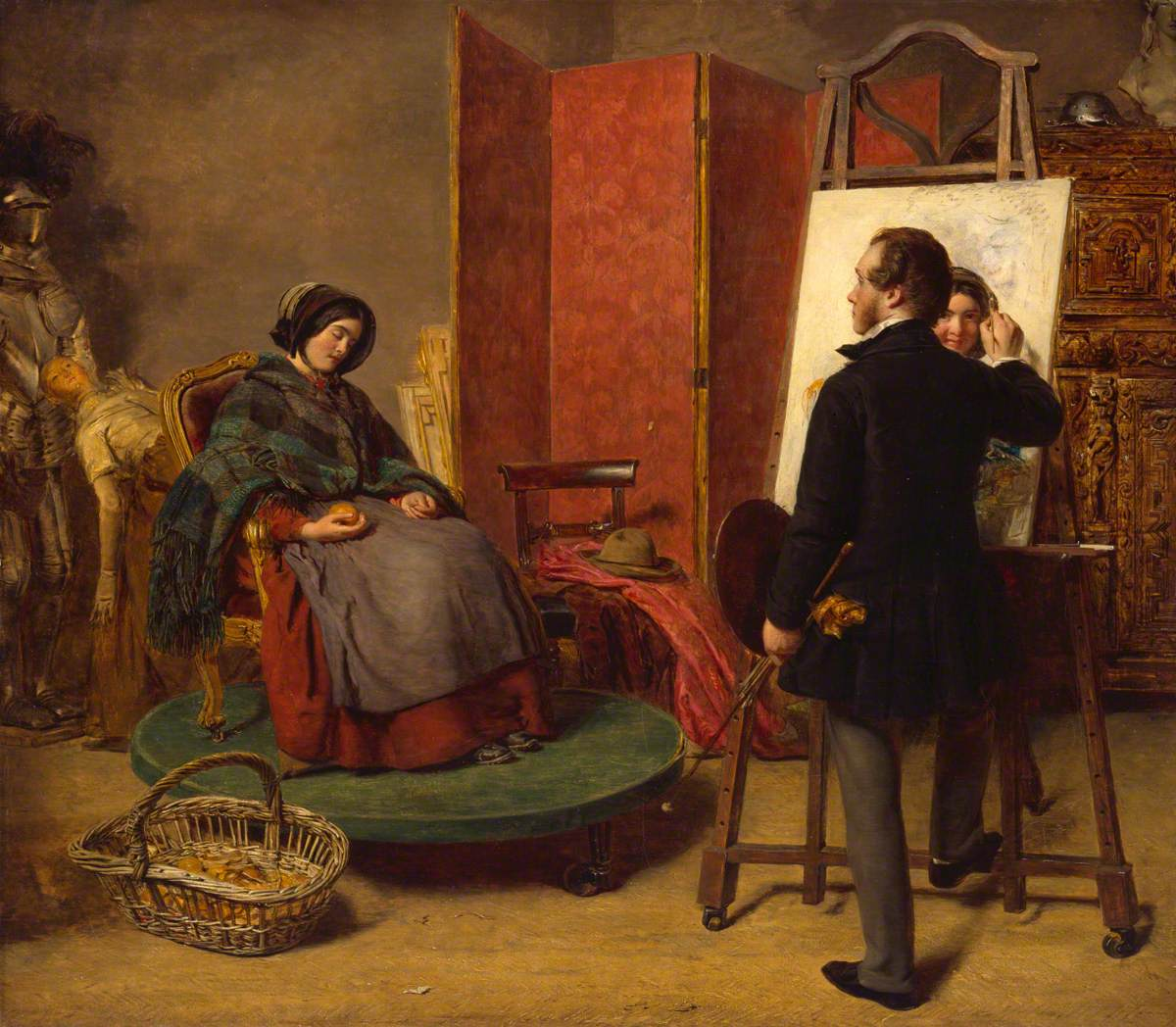
- Artist: William Powell Frith
- Year: 1853
- Type: Oil on canvas, genre painting
- Dimensions: 63.2 cm × 72.8 cm (24.9 in × 28.7 in)
- Location: Royal Academy of Arts, London

The Sleeping Model is an oil on canvas genre painting by the British artist William Powell Frith, from 1853.

== History and description ==
It shows a scene in the artist's own studio as he tries to paint a model who has fallen asleep in her chair. It features a self-portrait of himself as he doggedly continues to paint the young woman, an orange seller, smiling and awake. Frith had a great deal of trouble persuading the woman, whom he encountered in the street, to pose for him, partly due to the fact that she was a Catholic. Having eventually coaxed her to sit, she then fell asleep while he was working. The incident led Frith to produce this work inspired by what happened. It depicts a painter in the act who doing a portrait of a woman who has fallen asleep in a chair, while holding one orange in her hand. An almost empty basket of fruits lies in the ground, near her. When Frith was elected to be a full member of the Royal Academy of Arts in 1853, he presented this as his diploma work. It remains in the collection of the Royal Academy.

== Bibliography ==
- Bills, Mark & Knight, Vivien (ed.) William Powell Frith: Painting the Victorian Age. Yale University Press, 2006
- Green, Richard & Sellars, Jane. William Powell Frith: The People's Painter. Bloomsbury, 2019.
- Wood, Christopher. William Powell Frith: A Painter and His World. Sutton Publishing, 2006.
