= An English Merrymaking a Hundred Years Ago =

Painting by William Powell Frith

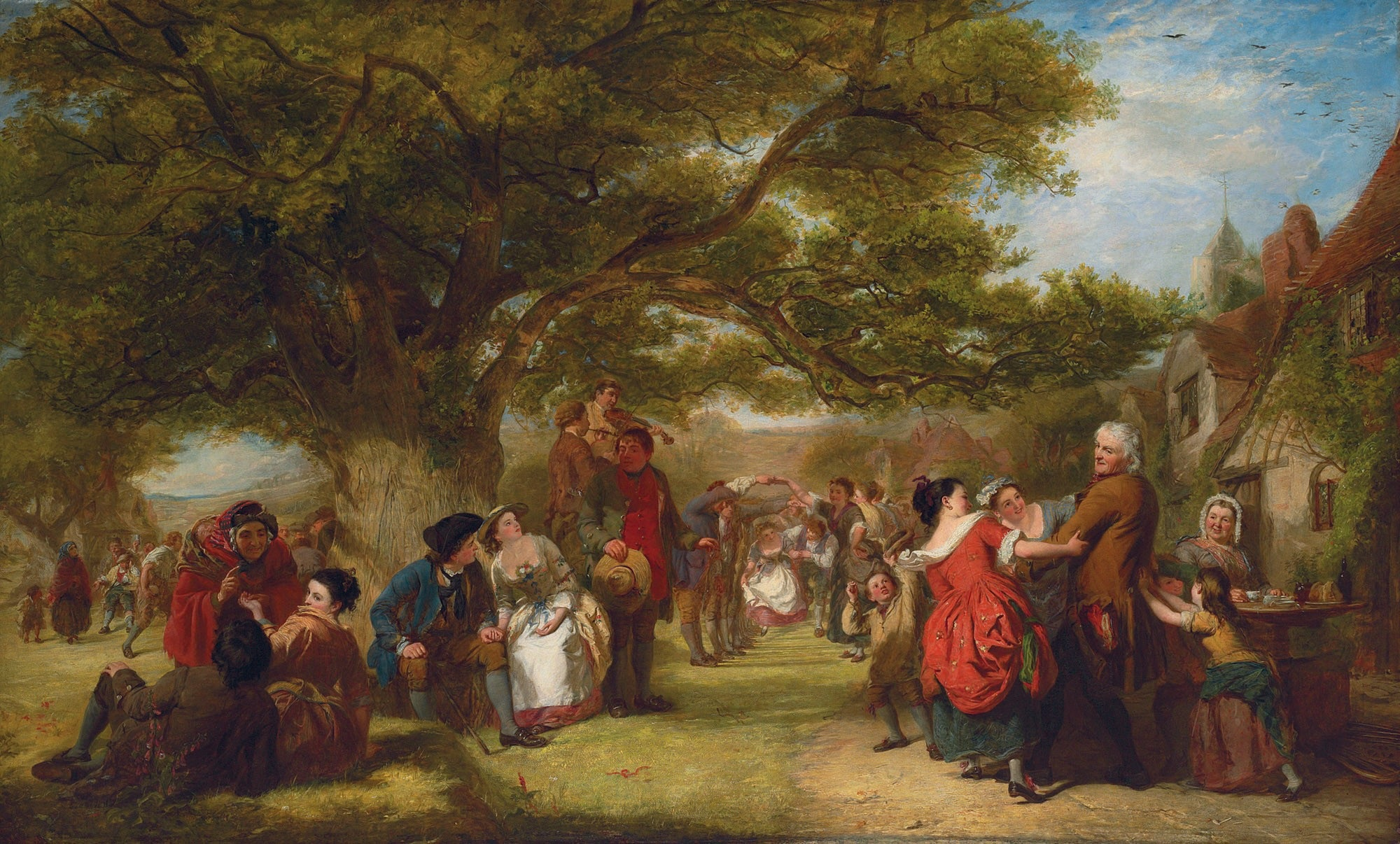
- Artist: William Powell Frith
- Year: 1847
- Type: Oil on canvas, genre painting
- Dimensions: 113 cm × 185.5 cm (44 in × 73.0 in)
- Location: Private collection

An English Merrymaking a Hundred Years Ago is an 1847 genre painting by the British artist William Powell Frith. During the early stages of his career Frith was a member of The Clique artistic group. He later became known for his panoramic crowd scenes The Derby Day and The Railway Station.

The work depicts a day of festivities in an English village in the mid-eighteenth century. It was one of several paintings that cemented Frith's growing reputation. It was exhibited at the Royal Academy's Summer Exhibition of 1847 at the National Gallery. An oil sketch for the painting is now in the Victoria and Albert Museum.

== See also ==
- The Village Holiday by Frederick Goodall, a painting with a similar theme produced the same year

== Bibliography ==
- Bills, Mark & Knight, Vivien (ed.) William Powell Frith: Painting the Victorian Age. Yale University Press, 2006
- Gaunt, William. The Restless Century: Painting in Britain, 1800–1900. Phaidon, 1972.
- Green, Richard & Sellars, Jane. William Powell Frith: The People's Painter. Bloomsbury, 2019.
- Wrightsman, Jayne. The Wrightsman Pictures. Metropolitan Museum of Art, 2005.
