= Self-Portrait (Frith) =

Painting by William Powell Frith

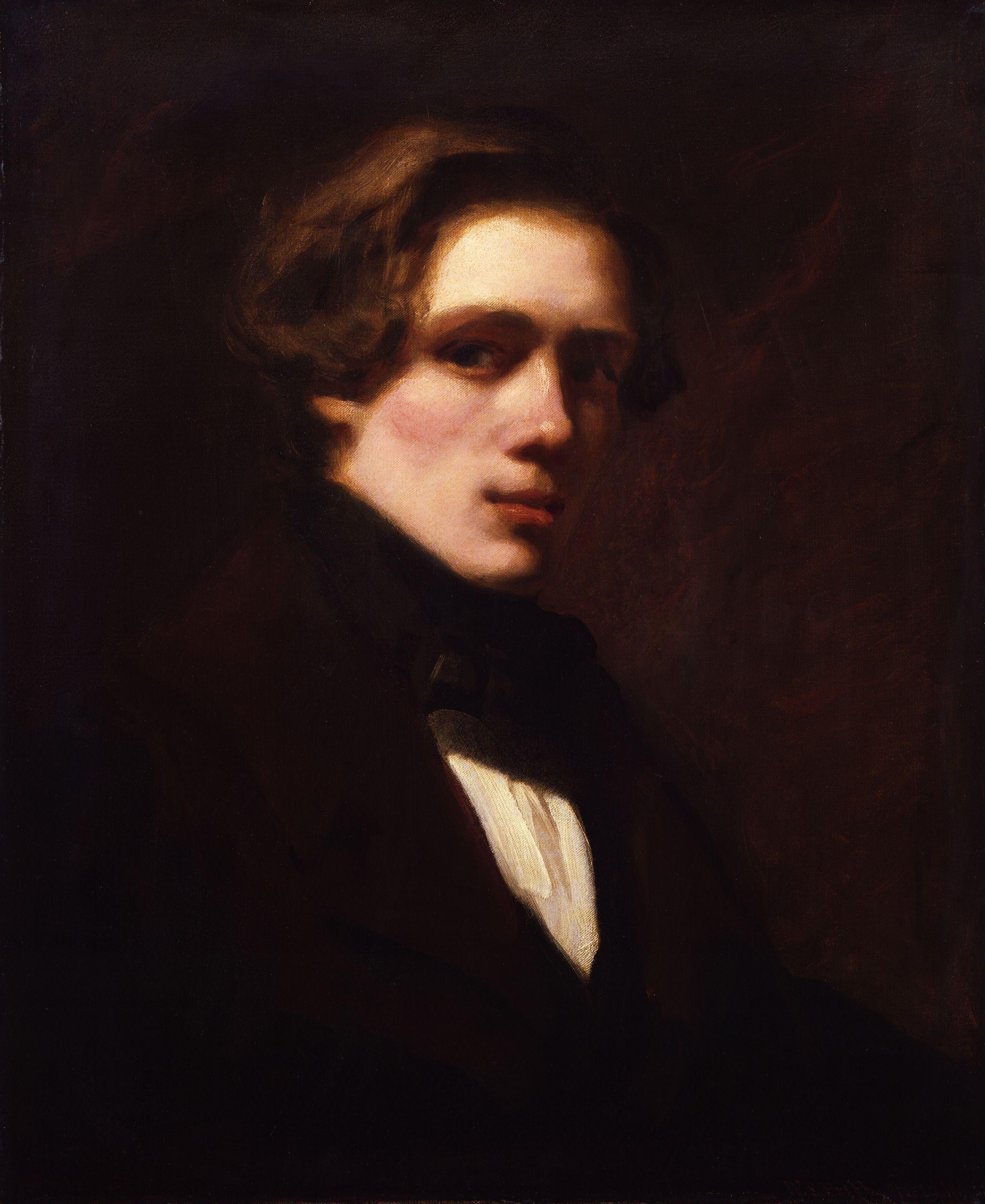
- Artist: William Powell Frith
- Year: 1838
- Type: Oil on canvas, portrait painting
- Dimensions: 60.5 cm × 50.5 cm (23.8 in × 19.9 in)
- Location: National Portrait Gallery, London

Self-Portrait' is an oil on canvas portrait painting by the British artist William Powell Frith, from 1838. A self-portrait, it depicts him at the age of around nineteen when he was a student at the Royal Academy. The same year he exhibited his first public work at the British Institution.

Powell Frith was one of the founding members of the The Clique group of artists. He enjoyed success with both his depictions of scenes from history and literature and with his larger panoramic scenes of Victorian Life such as Ramsgate Sands and The Derby Day. He continued to produce self-portraits throughout his career. This painting was donated by his daughter's Fanny and Louise to the National Portrait Gallery in 1926.

== Bibliography ==
- Green, Richard & Sellars, Jane. William Powell Frith: The People's Painter. Bloomsbury, 2019.
- Ormond, Richard. Early Victorian Portraits, National Portrait Gallery, 1974.
- Saywell, David & Simon, Jacob. National Portrait Gallery: Complete Illustrated Catalogue. National Portrait Gallery, 2004.
