= Bloodhound =

Dog breed used for tracking by scent

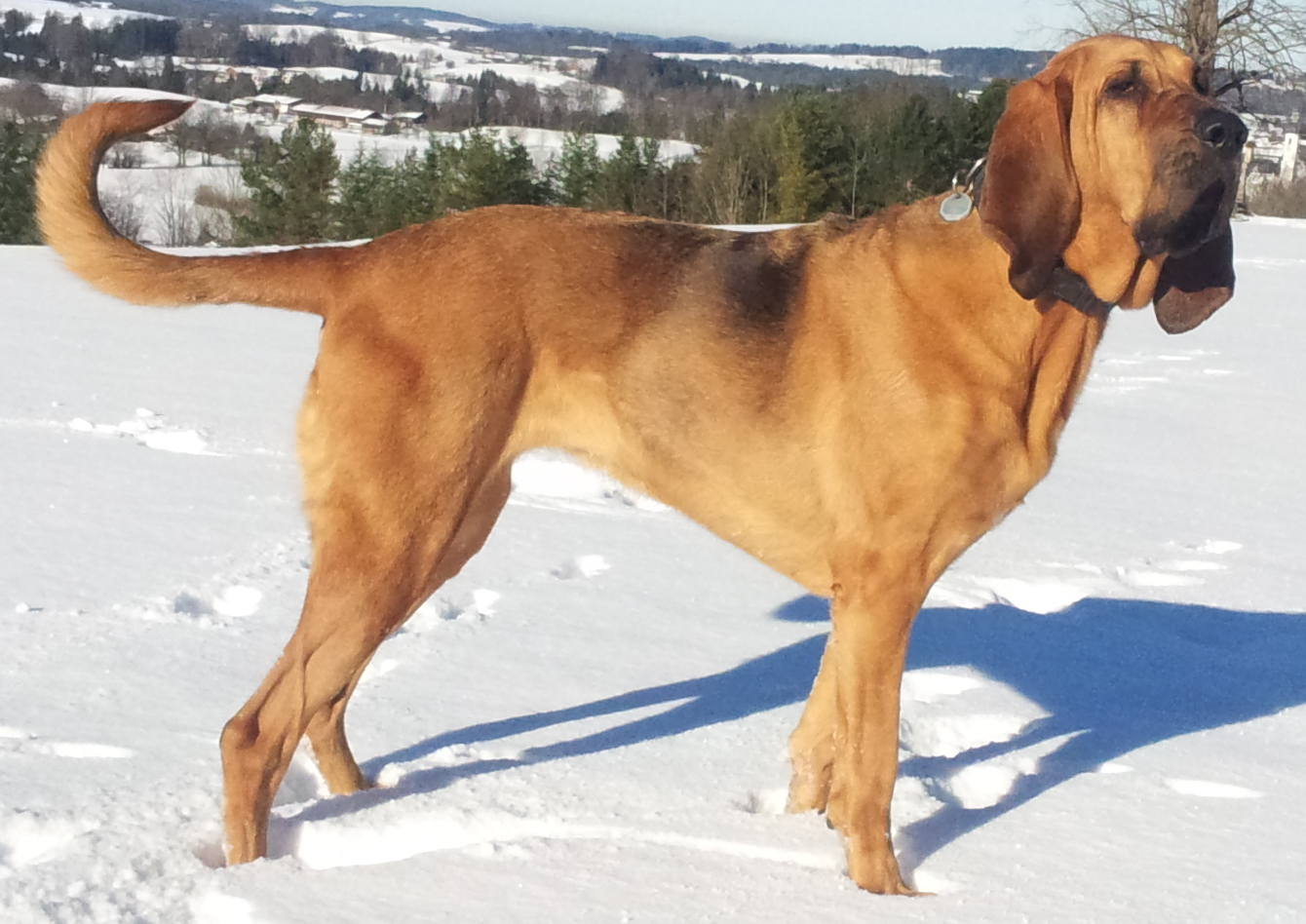
- Other names: Chien de St. Hubert; St. Hubert Hound; Sleuth-hound
- Origin: Belgium, France & the United Kingdom
Traits
Height	Males	64–72 cm (25–28 in)
	Females	58–66 cm (23–26 in)
Weight	Males	46–54 kg (101–119 lb)
	Females	40–48 kg (88–106 lb)
- Coat: Short
- Colour: Black and tan, liver and tan or red
Kennel club standards
- SRSH-KMSH: standard
- KC: standard
- Fédération Cynologique Internationale: standard

The bloodhound is a large scent hound, originally bred for hunting deer, wild boar, rabbits, and since the Middle Ages, for tracking people. Believed to be descended from hounds once kept at the Abbey of Saint-Hubert, Belgium, in French it is called le chien de Saint-Hubert.

This breed is known for its ability to discern human scent over large distances and extended periods of time through its keen sense of smell and strong tracking instincts. Bloodhounds are used by police and law enforcement around the world to track fugitives, missing people, and lost pets.

== Appearance ==
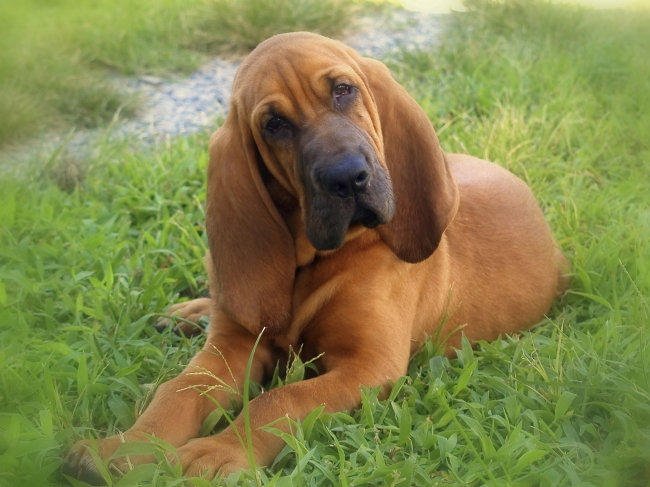
A Bloodhound puppy

Bloodhounds weigh from 36 to 72 kg (80 to 160 lbs). They are 58 to 70 cm (23 to 27 inches) tall at the withers. According to the AKC standard for the breed, larger dogs are preferred by conformation judges. Acceptable colors for bloodhounds are black, liver, and red. Bloodhounds possess an unusually large skeletal structure with most of their weight concentrated in their bones, which are very thick for their length. The coat, typical for a scent hound, is hard and composed of fur alone, with no admixture of hair.

== Temperament ==
This breed is reported to be gentle and is tireless when following a scent. Because of its strong tracking instinct, it can be willful and somewhat difficult to obedience train and handle on a leash. Bloodhounds are known to have an affectionate and even-tempered nature to humans, and are considered to be excellent family pets.

== Colour types ==
Up to at least the 17th century, Bloodhounds were of all colors, but in modern times the colours range has become more restricted. The colors are usually listed as black and tan, liver and tan, and red. White is not uncommon on the chest and sometimes appears on the feet. Genetically, the main types are determined by the action of two genes, found in many species. One produces an alternation between black and brown (liver). If a hound inherits the black allele (variant) from either parent, it has a black nose, eye rims, and paw pads, and if it has a saddle, it is black. The other allele suppresses black pigment and is recessive, so it must be inherited from both parents. It produces liver noses, eye rims, paw pads, and saddles.

The second gene determines the coat pattern. It can produce animals with no saddle (essentially all-tan, but called 'red' in Bloodhounds), ones with saddle-marking, or ones largely covered with darker (black or liver) pigment, except for tan lips, eyebrows, forechest, and lower legs. These last are sometimes referred to as 'blanket' or 'full-coat' types. In a pioneering study in 1969, Dennis Piper suggested five alleles in the pattern-marking gene, producing variants from the red or saddleless hound through three different types of progressively greater saddle marking to the 'blanket' type. However, more modern study attributes the variation to three different alleles of the agouti gene. A^{y} produces the non saddle-marked "red" hound, A^{s} produces saddle-marking, and a^{t} produces the blanket or full-coated hound. Of these A^{y} is dominant, and a^{t} is recessive to the others. The interaction of these variants of the two genes produces the six basic types shown below.

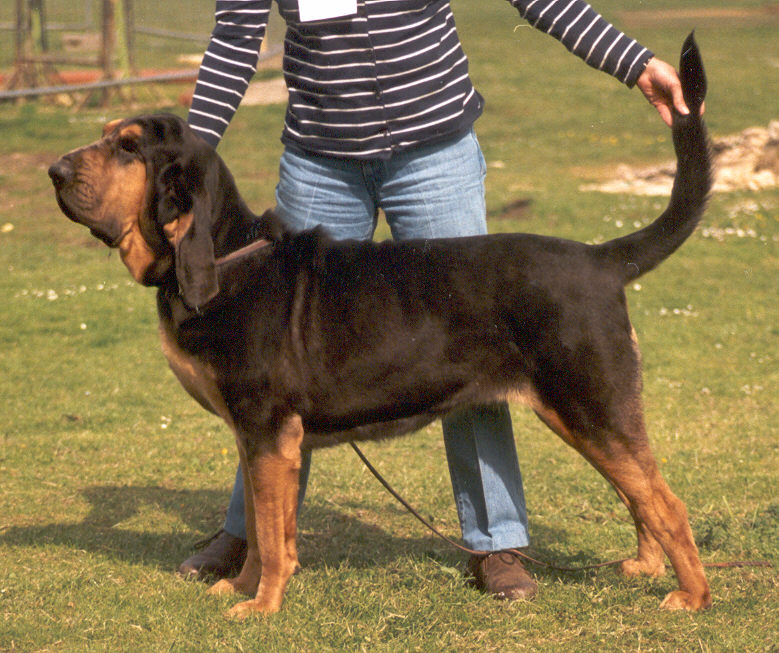
Black and tan, "blanket" or full-coat type

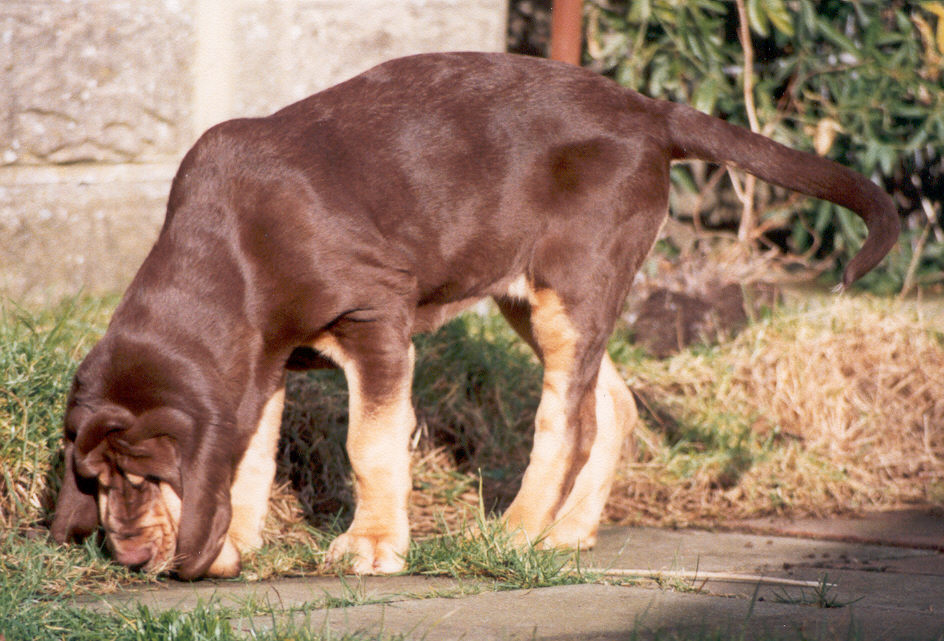
Liver and tan, "blanket" or full-coat type

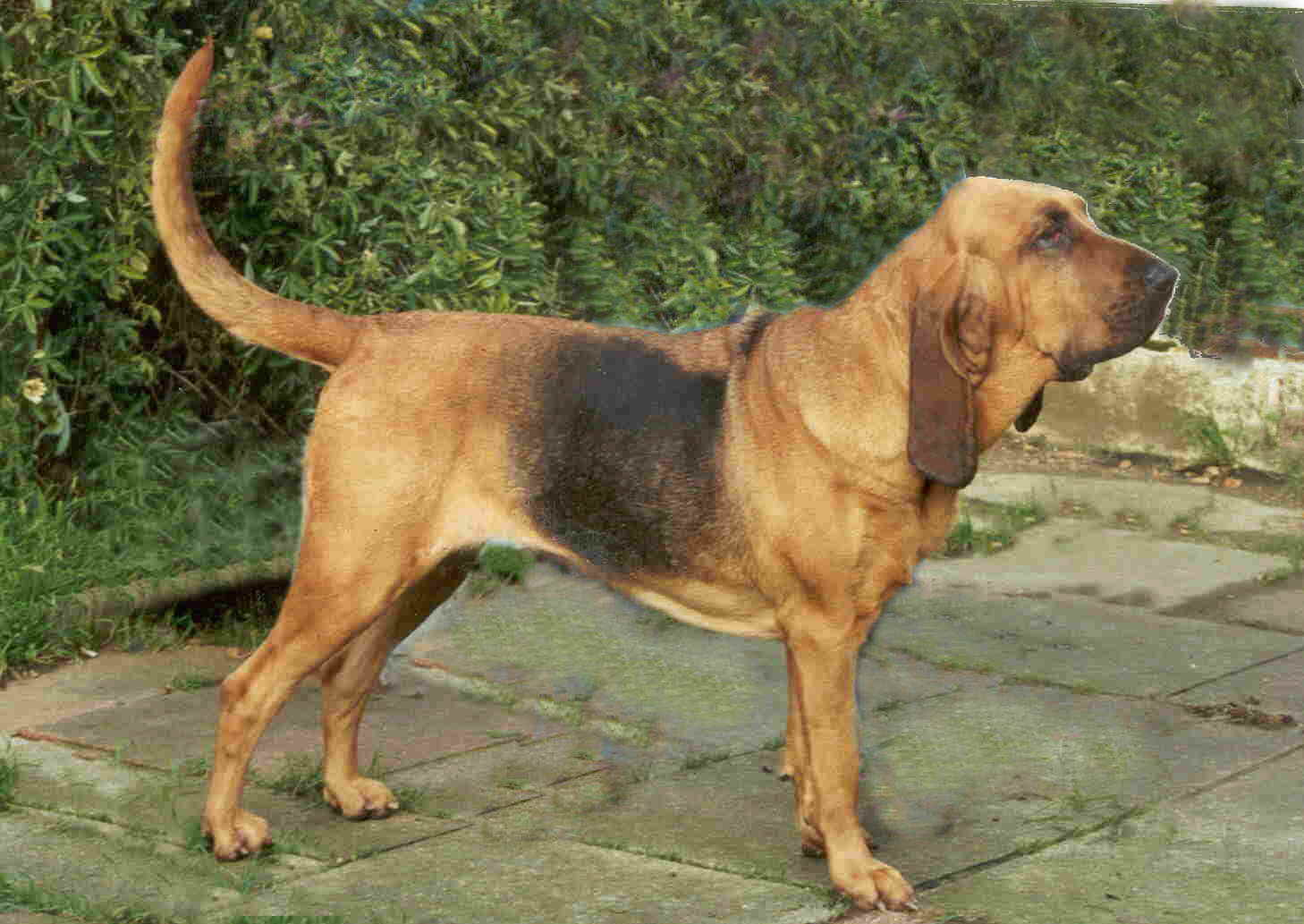
Black and tan saddle type

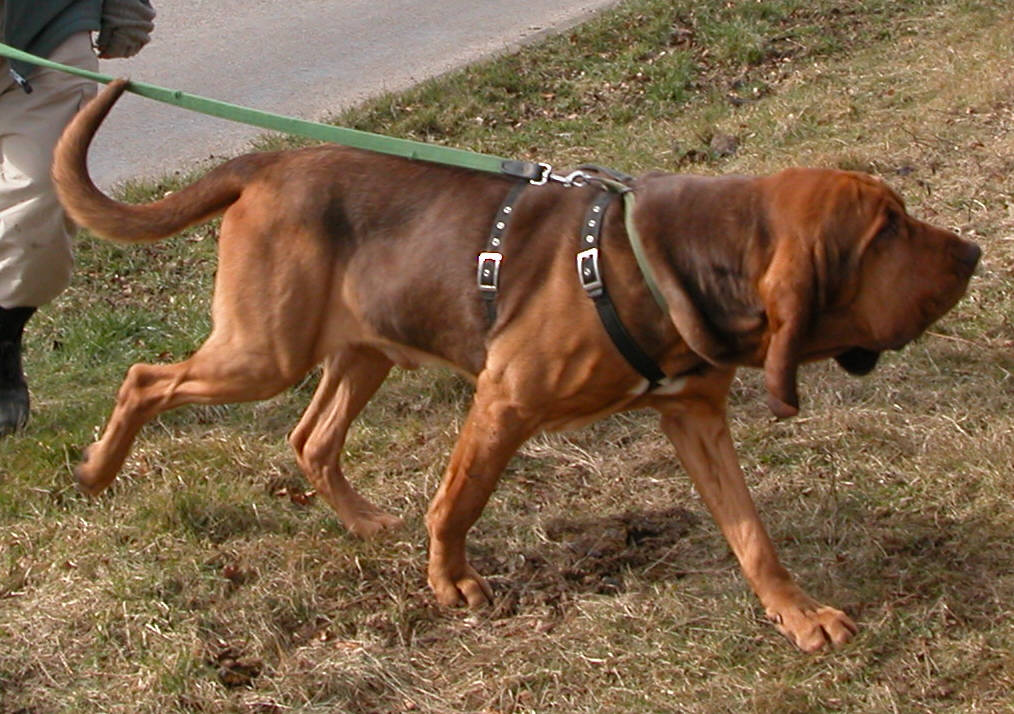
Liver and tan saddle type

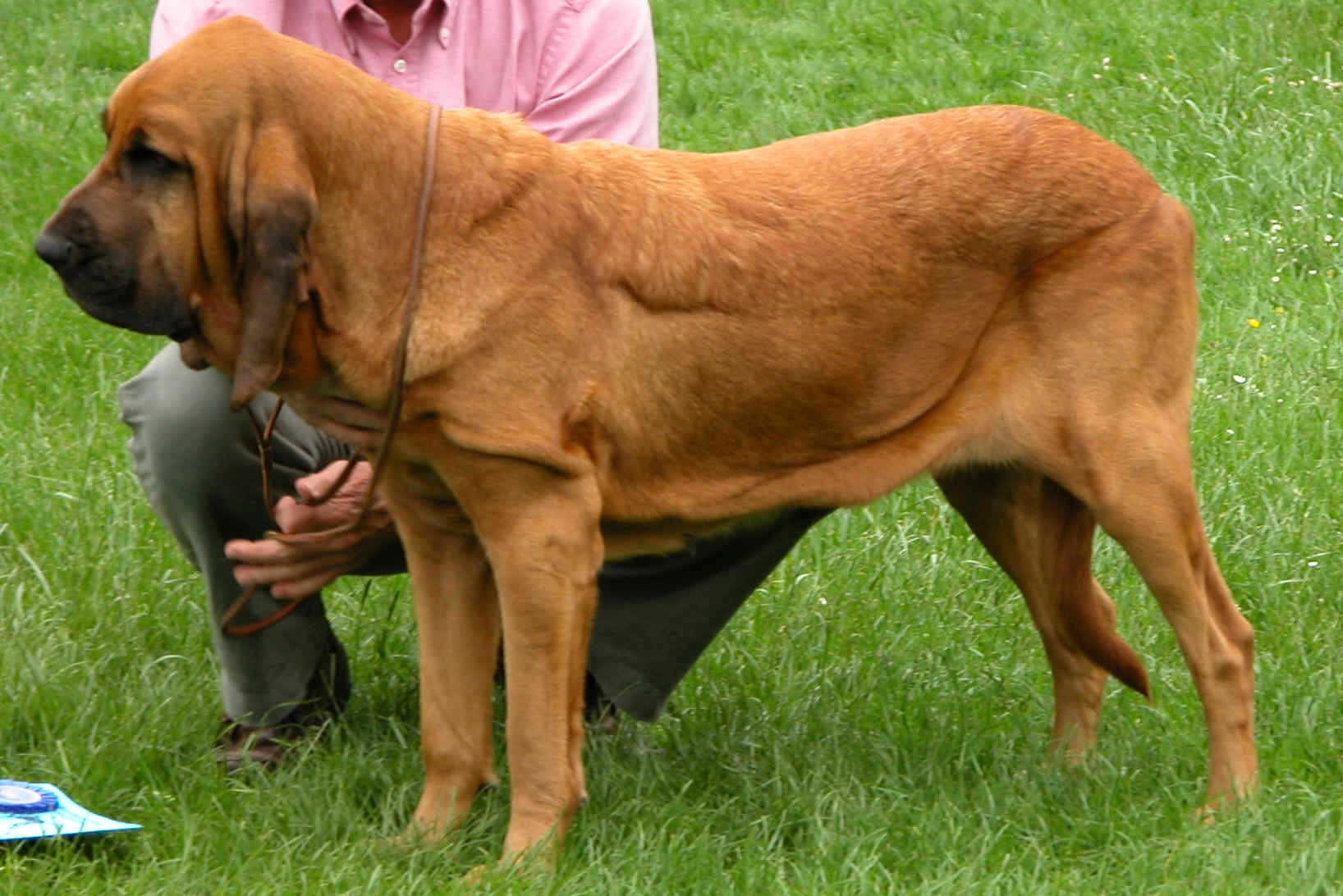
Red, black-pigmented type

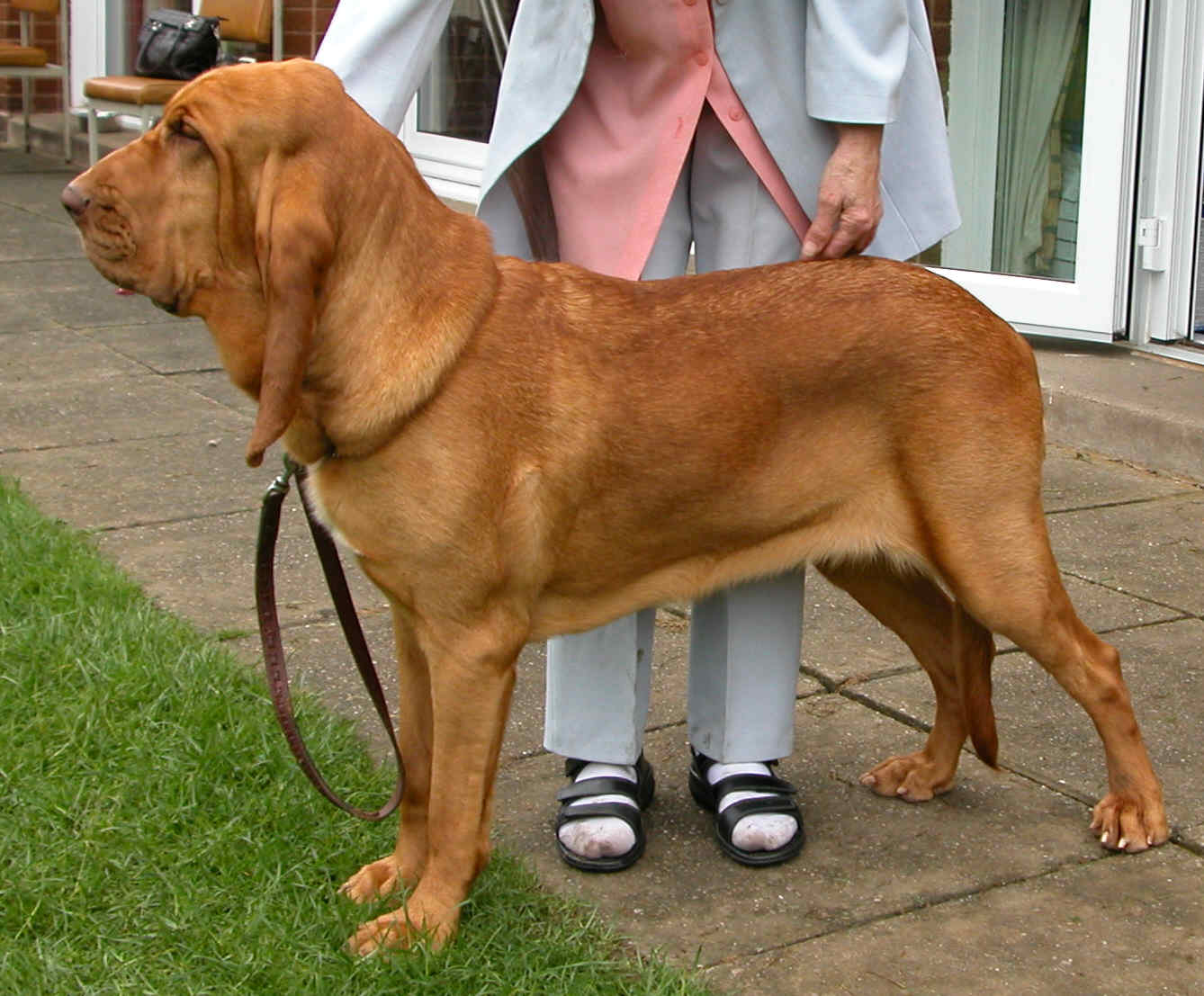
Red, liver-pigmented type

Another source does not recognise a^{s} as a separate variant. Instead, it says "a^{t} includes tan point and saddle tan, both of which look tan point at birth. Modifier genes in saddle tan puppies cause a gradual reduction of the black area until the saddle tan pattern is achieved." 'Tan point' refers to the blanket type from the typical tan eyebrows, muzzle, and socks.

It is likely that a third gene determines whether or not there is a melanistic mask. E^{m}, the allele for a mask, is dominant over E, the allele for no mask.

== Health ==
=== Illnesses ===
Compared to other purebred dogs, Bloodhounds suffer an unusually high rate of gastrointestinal ailments, with gastric dilatation volvulus (bloat) being the most common type of gastrointestinal problem. The breed also suffers an unusually high incidence of eye, skin, and ear ailments; thus these areas should be inspected frequently for signs of developing problems. Owners should be especially aware of the signs of bloat, which is both the most common illness and the leading cause of death of Bloodhounds. The thick coat gives the breed the tendency to overheat quickly.

=== Lifespan ===
A 2024 UK study found a life expectancy of 9.3 years for the breed compared to an average of 12.7 for purebreeds and 12 for crossbreeds. In a 2004 Kennel Club survey the most common cause of death was gastric dilatation volvulus at 34%, the second leading cause of death in the study was cancer, at 27%.

== History ==
=== Chien de Saint-Hubert ===
The St. Hubert Hound was, according to legend, first bred ca. AD 1000 by monks at the Saint-Hubert Monastery in Belgium; its likely origins are in France, home of many of modern hounds. It is held to be the ancestor of several other breeds, like the extinct Norman Hound, and Saintongeois, and the modern Grand Bleu de Gascogne, Gascon Saintongeois, Ariegeois and Artois Normande, as well as the Bloodhound. It has been suggested that it was a dog of mixed breeding, not at all uniform in type.

Whether they originated there, or what their ancestry was, is uncertain, but from ca. 1200, the monks of the Abbey of St. Hubert annually sent several pairs of black hounds as a gift to the King of France. They were not always highly thought of in the royal pack. Charles IX 1550–74, preferred his white hounds and the larger Chiens-gris, and wrote that the St. Huberts were suitable for people with gout to follow, but not for those who wished to shorten the life of the hunted animal. He described them as pack hounds of medium stature, long in the body, not well sprung in the ribs, and of no great strength. Writing in 1561, Jaques du Fouilloux describes them as strong of body, but with low, short legs. He says they have become mixed in breeding so that they are now of all colors and widely distributed. Charles described the 'true race' of St. Hubert as black, with red/tawny marks above the eyes and legs usually of the same color, suggesting a 'blanket' black and tan (see the section on colour types above). To De Fouilloux, the 'pure black' was the best of this mixed breed. Both writers thought them only useful as leash hounds. They both refer to a white hound, also a St. Hubert, which by their time had disappeared, having been interbred with another white hound, the greffier, to produce the king's preferred pack hound, sometimes called le chien blanc du roi, "the white dog of the king".

They appear to have been more highly thought of during the reign of Henry IV (1553–1610), who presented a pack to James I of England. By the end of the reign of Louis XIV (1715), they were already rare. In 1788, D'Yauville, who was master of the Royal hounds, says those sent by the St. Hubert monks, once much prized, had degenerated, and scarcely one of the annual gift of six or eight was kept.

Upon the French Revolution of 1789, the gifts ceased, and hunting in France went into a decline until the end of the Napoleonic Wars. When it recovered during the 19th century, huntsmen, with many breeds to choose from, seem to have had little interest in the St. Hubert. An exception was Baron Le Couteulx de Canteleu, who tried to find them. He reported that there were hardly any in France, and those in the Ardennes were so crossbred that they had lost the characteristics of the breed.

Writers on the Bloodhound in the last two centuries generally agreed that the original St. Hubert strain died out in the 19th century, and that the European St. Hubert owes its present existence to the development of the Bloodhound.

=== Bloodhound ===
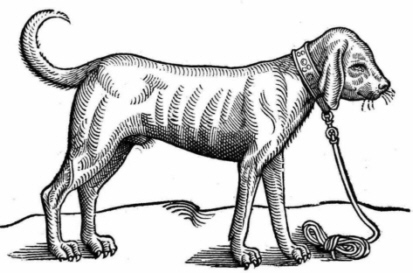
English Bloodhound, 1563

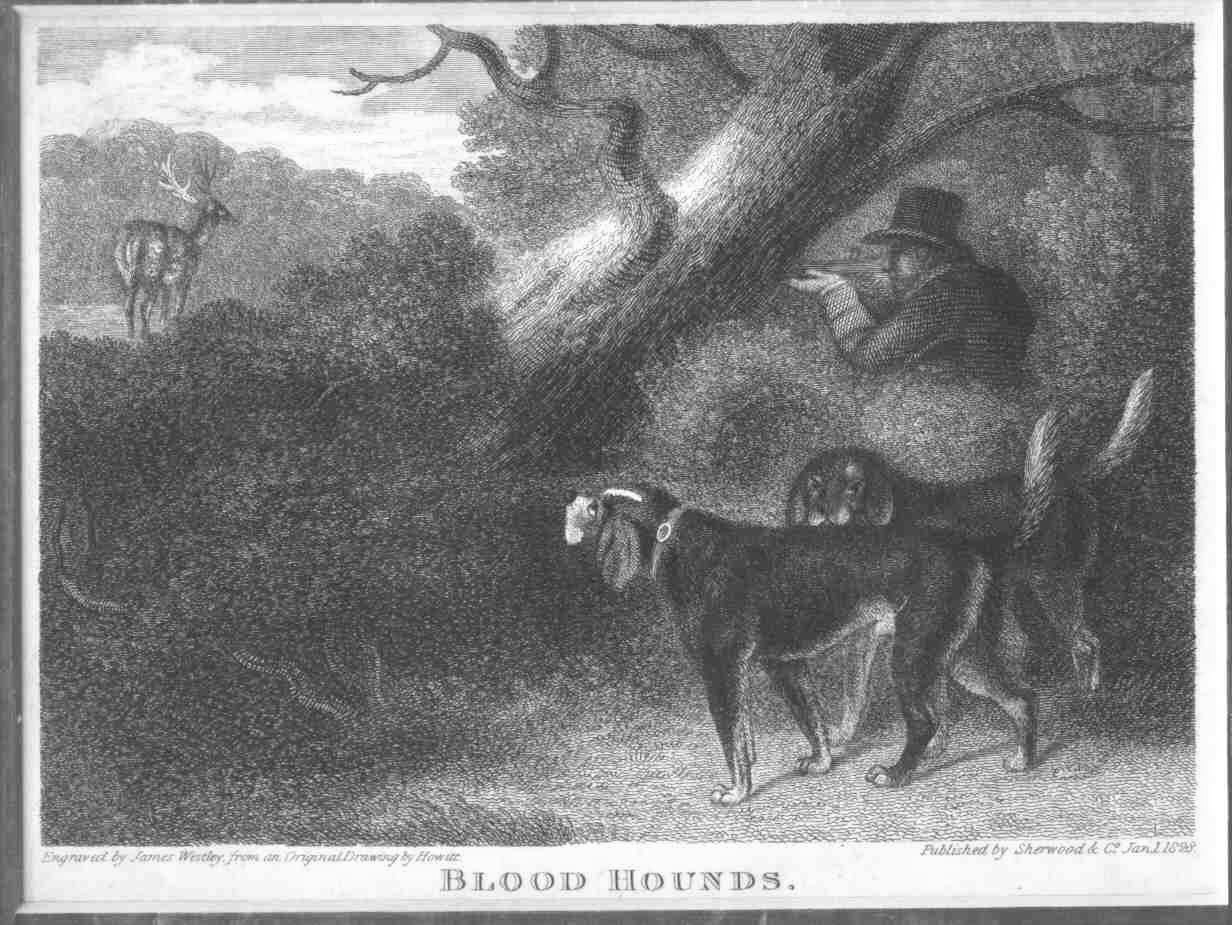
Bloodhounds used to find deer, 1826

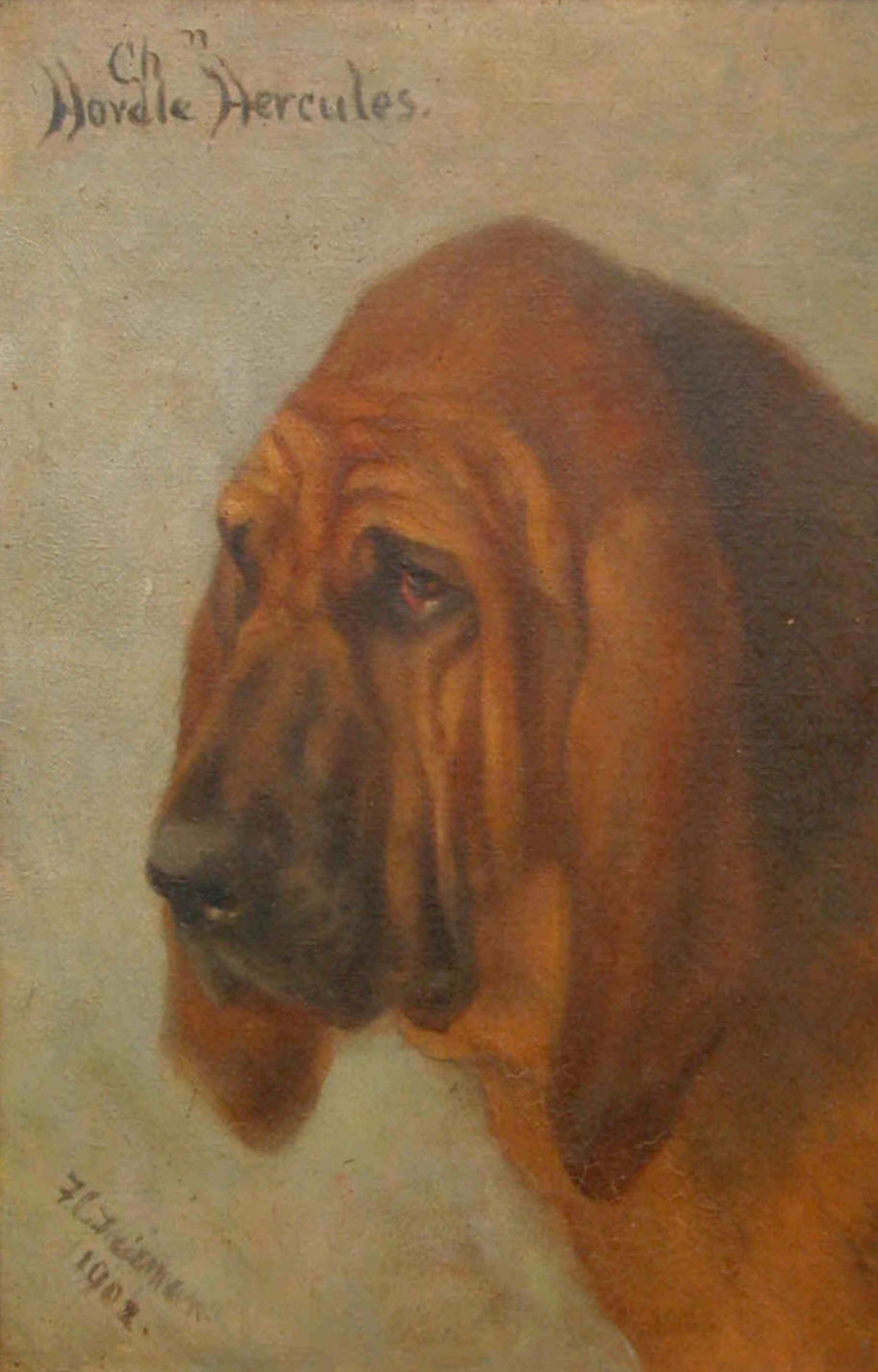
Ancestor of pedigree Bloodhounds, 1902

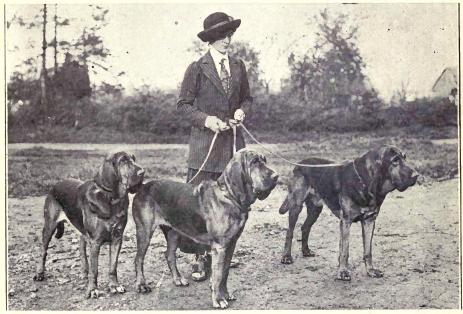
Bloodhounds, circa 1915

References to Bloodhounds first appear in English writing in the early to mid-14th century, in contexts that suggest the breed was well established by then. It is often claimed that its ancestors were brought over from Normandy by William the Conqueror, but there is no actual evidence for this. It is virtually certain that the Normans brought hounds from Europe during the post-Conquest period, but it remains disputed whether this included the Bloodhound itself or merely its ancestors. This question likely cannot be resolved with surviving evidence.

In Medieval hunting, the typical use of the Bloodhound was as a 'limer', or 'lyam hound', that is a dog handled on a leash or 'lyam', to find the hart or boar before it was hunted by the pack hounds (raches). It was prized for its ability to hunt the cold scent of an individual animal, and, though it did not usually take part in the kill, it was given a special reward from the carcass.

It also seems that from the earliest times the Bloodhound was used to track people. There are stories written in medieval Scotland of Robert the Bruce (in 1307), and William Wallace (1270–1305) being followed by 'sleuth hounds'. Whether true or not, these stories show that the sleuth hound was already known as a man-trailer, and it later becomes clear that the sleuth hound and the Bloodhound were the same animal.

In the 16th century, John Caius, in the most important single source in the history of the Bloodhound, describes its hanging ears and lips, its use in game parks to follow the scent of blood, which gives it its name, its ability to track thieves and poachers by their foot scent, how it casts if it has lost the scent when thieves cross water, and its use on the Scottish borders to track cross-border raiders, known as Border Reivers. This links it to the sleuth hound, and from Caius also comes the information that the English Bloodhound and the sleuth hound were essentially the same, though the Bloodhound was slightly bigger, with more variation in coat color.

The adjacent picture was published in Zurich in 1563, in Conrad Gesner's Thierbuch (a compendium of animals) with the captions: 'Englischen Blüthund' and 'Canis Sagax Sanguinarius apud Anglos' (English scent hound with associations of blood). It was drawn by, or under the supervision of, John Caius, and sent to Gesner with other drawings to illustrate his descriptions of British dogs for European readers. It is thus the earliest known picture published specifically to demonstrate the appearance of the Bloodhound. We are told it was done from life, and detail such as the soft hang of the ear indicates it was carefully observed. Fully accurate or not, it suggests changes between the Bloodhound of then and today. The collar and long coiled rope reflect the Bloodhound's typical functions as a limer or leashed man-trailer in that period.

The earliest known report of a trial of the Bloodhound's trailing abilities comes from the scientist Robert Boyle, who described how a Bloodhound tracked a man seven miles along a route frequented by people, and found him in an upstairs room of a house.

With the rise of fox hunting, the decline of deer hunting, and the extinction of the wild boar in Great Britain, as well as a more settled state of society, the use of the Bloodhound diminished. It was kept by the aristocratic owners of a few deer parks and by a few enthusiasts, with some variation in type, until its popularity began to increase again with the rise of dog shows in the 19th century. Numbers, however, have remained low in Britain. Very few survived the Second World War, but the gene pool has gradually been replenished with imports from America. Nevertheless, because of UK quarantine restrictions, importing was expensive and difficult throughout the 20th century, and in the post-war period exports to the US, and to Europe where the population had also been affected by the war, considerably exceeded imports.

During the later 19th century, numbers of Bloodhounds were imported from Britain by French enthusiasts, who regretted the extinction of the ancient St. Hubert. They wished to re-establish it, using the Bloodhound, which, despite its developments in Britain, they regarded as the St. Hubert preserved unchanged. Many of the finest specimens were bought and exhibited and bred in France as Chiens de Saint-Hubert, especially by Le Couteulx de Canteleu, who himself bred over 300. Whatever few original St. Huberts remained either died out or were absorbed into the new population. As a result, the Bloodhound became known on parts of the Continent as the Chien de Saint-Hubert. In the mid-20th century, the Brussels-based FCI accepted the claim of Belgium to be the country of origin. There are now annual celebrations in the town of Saint-Hubert, in which handlers in period dress parade their hounds. In Britain, the Bloodhound has continued to be seen as a native breed, with European St. Huberts being accepted by the UK KC as Bloodhounds.

In Le Couteulx' book of 1890, we read that 'Le Chien de St Hubert actuel' is very big, from 69 cm to 80 cm (27½–31½in) high. This does not accord with the 16th century descriptions of the St. Hubert given above, nor with the FCI standard, but the idea that the St. Hubert is much bigger (up to 91.5 cm, 36 in) than the Bloodhound persisted well into the 20th century, even among some St. Hubert enthusiasts.

When the first Bloodhounds were exported to the US is not known. Bloodhounds were used to track runaway slaves before the American Civil War, but it has been questioned whether the dogs used were genuine Bloodhounds. However, in the later part of the 19th century, and in the next, more pure Bloodhounds were introduced from Britain and bred in America, especially after 1888, when the English breeder, Edwin Brough, brought three of his hounds to exhibit at the Westminster Kennel Club Dog Show in New York City. He went into partnership with Mr. J. L. Winchell who, with other Americans, imported more stock from Britain. Bloodhounds in America have been more widely used in tracking lost people and criminals – often with brilliant success – than in Britain, and the history of the Bloodhound in America is full of the man-trailing exploits of outstanding Bloodhounds and their expert handlers, the most famous hound being Nick Carter. Law enforcement agencies have been much involved in the use of Bloodhounds, and there is a National Police Bloodhound Association, originating in 1962.

In Britain, there have been instances from time to time of the successful use of the Bloodhound to track criminals or missing people. However, man-trailing is enjoyed as a sport by British Bloodhound owners, through national working trials, and this enthusiasm has spread to Europe. In addition, while the pure Bloodhound is used to hunt singly, Bloodhound packs use Bloodhounds crossed with foxhounds to hunt the human scent.

Meanwhile, the Bloodhound has become widely distributed internationally, though numbers are small in most countries, with more in the US than anywhere else. Following the spread of the Bloodhound from Britain in the 19th and 20th centuries, imports and exports and, increasingly, artificial insemination, are maintaining the world population as a common breeding stock, without a great deal of divergence in type in different countries.

During the late 19th century, Bloodhounds were frequent subjects for artists such as Edwin Landseer and Briton Riviere; the dogs depicted are close in appearance to modern Bloodhounds, indicating that the essential character of the Bloodhound predates modern dog breeding. However, the dogs depicted by Landseer show fewer wrinkles.

== Origin issues ==
Throughout most of its history the Bloodhound was seen as a dog of English or Anglo-Scottish origin, either of unknown ancestry, or, more recently, as developed in part from the St. Hubert. It was only in the 19th century that it was claimed, primarily by Le Couteulx, to be the St. Hubert itself. Medieval hunting pictures show raches and limers, of the general sagax type, with hanging ears and lips, but not having the specific characteristics of the Bloodhound. 16th century descriptions of the St. Hubert as short-legged, and only medium-sized have led to speculation that the main European antecedent of the Bloodhound was rather the Norman hound, which was much larger than the St. Hubert.

Others, such as the sleuth hound, the Talbot Hound, the dun hound and the Southern Hound, as well as pack hounds, have also been supposed to have contributed to its make-up. Some writers doubt whether anything certain can be said about specific breed ancestry beyond the last few centuries. The picture given by Le Couteulx and D'Yauville of the St. Hubert was that it changed considerably through mixed breeding, and perhaps degenerated, before its disappearance, while the Bloodhound which replaced it preserved its original character. However, it is apparent from 16th century pictures that the Bloodhound itself has changed considerably.

The modern St. Hubert is the English Bloodhound, in descent and type. Generally, national and regional variants of hounds, terriers, spaniels, etc. have been recognised as separate breeds, France in particular having many regional breeds of hound; the Bloodhound's identification as the St. Hubert makes it an anomaly in this respect. Whether the Bloodhound is British or Belgian in origin is ultimately not something one can prove historically, depending as it does on whether one chooses to regard two related animals differing in tradition, and history, and somewhat in type, as separate breeds, or variants of the same one.

== Breed standard ==
Descriptions of the desirable physical qualities of a hunting hound go back to medieval books on hunting. All dogs used in the hunting field were 'gentle', that is of good breeding (not necessarily pure breeding), and parents were carefully chosen to maintain and improve conformation. In 1896, making some use of wording found in earlier descriptions, Edwin Brough and Dr. J. Sidney Turner published Points and Characteristics of the Bloodhound or Sleuth-Hound. This was adopted by the newly formed Association of Bloodhound Breeders, and ultimately became, with very little change, the 'official' breed standard of the KC and the AKC.

Meanwhile, the Belgian or Dutch Comte Henri de Bylandt, or H A Graaf van Bylandt, published Races des Chiens in 1897, a huge and very important illustrated compilation of breed descriptions, or standards. In this French edition, the Bloodhound appears as the Chien de St. Hubert, although the pictures illustrating the standard are all of British Bloodhounds, many of them those of Edwin Brough. The book was revised and reprinted in four languages in 1904, and in this edition the English text of the standard is that of the Association of Bloodhound Breeders, while the French text is closely based on it. However, the present FCI standard uses a quite different layout and wording.

The AKC standard has hardly been altered from the original of 1896, the principal change being that the colours, 'black and tan', 'red and tan', and 'tawny', have been renamed as 'black and tan', 'liver and tan', and 'red', but the British KC has made considerable changes. Some of these were simply matters of presentation and did not affect content. However, responding to the view that the requirements of some breed standards were potentially detrimental to the health or well-being of the animal, changes have been made affecting the required eye shape and the loose skin, the most recent revision being 2008–9.

== Etymology ==
The word 'bloodhound' is recorded from c. 1330. Most recent accounts say that its etymological meaning is 'hound of pure or noble blood'. This derives from an original suggestion of Le Couteulx de Canteleu in the 19th century, which has been enthusiastically and uncritically espoused by later writers, perhaps because it absolved this undoubtedly good-natured dog from suggestions of bloodthirstiness. Neither Le Couteulx nor anyone since has offered any historical evidence to support this view. The suggestion sometimes seen that the word derives from 'blooded hound' is without basis, as the expression does not appear in early English, and 'blooded' in this meaning is not found before the late 18th century.

Before then, 'bloodhound' had been taken to mean, 'hound for blood', or 'blood-seeking hound'. This was the explanation put forward by John Caius, who was one of the most learned men of his time, and had an interest in etymology, in the 16th century. It is supported by considerable historical linguistic evidence, which can be gleaned from such sources as the Oxford English Dictionary (OED): the fact that first uses of the word 'blood' to refer to good breeding in an animal postdate the first use of 'bloodhound'; that other comparable uses, as in 'blood horse' and 'blood stock' appear many centuries later; and that derogatory uses of the word 'bloodhound', which any suggestion of noble breeding would sadly weaken, appear from as early as c. 1400. Other early sources tell us that hounds were supposed to have an interest in blood, and that the Bloodhound was used to follow the trail of a wounded animal. In the absence of anything in early usage, or any historical evidence whatsoever, to support the modern explanation, the older must be regarded as correct.

== Working the Bloodhound ==
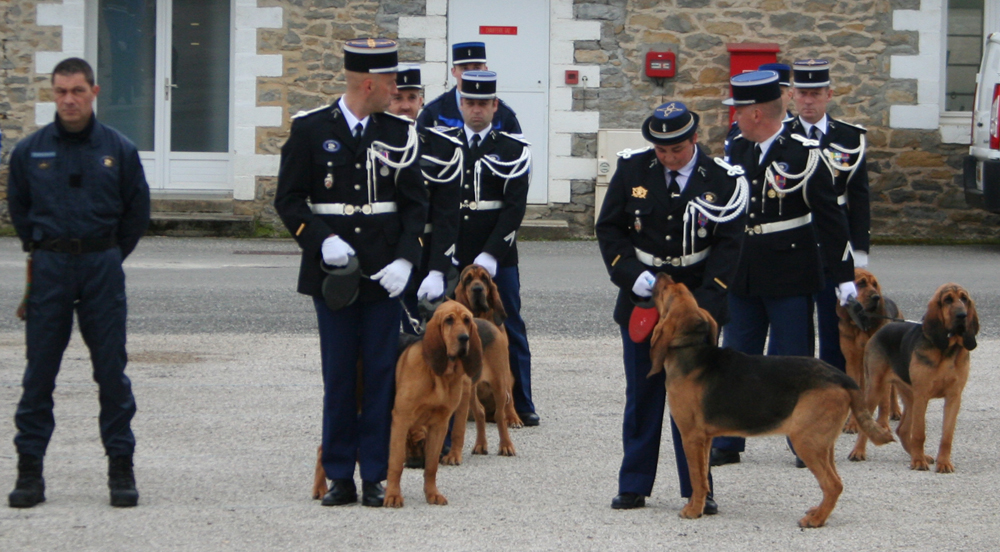
Police dogs with the French police

=== Scenting ability ===
The Bloodhound's physical characteristics account for its ability to follow a scent trail left several days in the past. The olfactory bulb in dogs is roughly 40 times bigger than the olfactory bulb in humans, relative to total brain size, with 125 to 220 million olfactory receptors. Consequently, dogs have an olfactory sense 40 times more sensitive than that of a human. Scent hounds like the Bloodhound have a more developed olfactory sense and can reach nearly 300 million receptors.

The large, long pendent ears serve to prevent wind from scattering nearby skin cells while the dog's nose is on the ground; the folds of wrinkled flesh under the lips and neck—called the shawl—serve to catch stray scent particles in the air or on a nearby branch as the Bloodhound is scenting, reinforcing the scent in the dog's memory and nose. However, not all agree that the long ears and loose skin are functional, some regarding them as a handicap.

=== Human trailing ===
There are many accounts of Bloodhounds successfully following trails many hours, and even several days old, the record being of a family found dead in Oregon, in 1954, over 330 hours after they had gone missing. The Bloodhound is generally used to follow the individual scent of a fugitive or lost person, taking the scent from a 'scent article' – something the quarry is known to have touched, which could be an item of clothing, a car seat, an identified footprint, etc. Many Bloodhounds will follow the drift of scent a good distance away from the actual footsteps of the quarry, which can enable them to cut corners and reach the end of the trail more quickly. In America, sticking close to the footsteps is called 'tracking', while the freer method is known as 'trailing' (in the UK, 'hunting'), and is held to reflect the Bloodhound's concentration on the individual human scent, rather than that of, say, vegetation crushed by the feet of the quarry. If the scent is lost, a good Bloodhound persistently casts about to recover it. The Bloodhound is handled on a tracking harness, which has a metal ring above the shoulders, to which a leash is attached, so that the hound's neck is not jerked up when the leash becomes taut, as it would with a collar. The leash is at least long enough to allow the hound to cross freely in front of the handler, some handlers preferring quite a short leash, giving better communication with the hound, others liking something longer, maybe 6 to 9 metres (20 to 30 ft).

=== Training ===
It is generally agreed that the basis of initial training is to make the experience enjoyable for the puppy or young hound to keep their enthusiasm high. Whitney preferred waiting until the hound is 18 months old, to start training, but others start as young as possible; say, three months. Training can be started by running short trails on a family member whom the puppy sees walk away, at first remaining visible, and later going out of sight. Even though familiar with the scent of the 'runner', the dog can be given a scent article to sniff, and given the command to follow. The dog can also be introduced to the tracking harness, which is put on just before the trail starts, and removed as soon as it is finished. On reaching the runner, the puppy is given lavish praise and perhaps a reward. Generally in training, the handler must know exactly where the runner went, so that the handler does not encourage the hound to go the wrong way, or 'correct' the hound when the hound is on the scent; however, the handler should not be too ready with corrections if the hound goes astray, or the hound may come to rely on the handler too much. The handler should give the hound time to realise their mistake and put themselves right, if possible. As training progresses the handler learns to 'read' the hound's behaviour. The hound must trust their own nose and the handler must trust the hound. From early hot trails on a familiar person, the young hound progresses to colder trails on the scents of strangers. Later training can be designed to teach particular lessons: crossing trails with false scents, having the runner start out with a companion, who leaves the runner somewhere along the trail, laying a trail on ground frequented by wild animals. This will teach the hound not to change on to other humans, or riot on animal scents (known as 'staying clean' [US], or 'freedom from change' [UK]). The hound also needs to work over a variety of ground and learn to cope with distractions of many kinds, as well as being introduced to 'negative trails': given a scent article which has not been handled by anyone in the area, so that the hound will learn to indicate to a handler that the required scent is not there. If the hound is becoming discouraged they can revert to simpler tasks to recover enthusiasm.

=== Identification ===
Canine identification of a suspect can help police with their inquiries, and evidence of identification is accepted in some courts. The most approved method of identification is for the hound to jump up, and place its paws on the subject's chest. In the case of a lost person or a known fugitive identification will not be significant, and in the case of a potentially violent, possibly armed, fugitive, a Bloodhound handler will not want their dog to approach the quarry for fear of injury to the Bloodhound. Many Bloodhounds reaching the end of a trail will show no interest in the person they have been trailing, and are difficult to train to identify. Leon Whitney recommended a method of initial training in which identification was the first thing learned, based on giving the young hound a scent article from someone who walks a very short distance out of sight into a barn, where they stand with a piece of liver, while another person, also smelling of liver, stands nearby. The hound is led along the 'trail', and if they show an inclination to go to the wrong person, they are chastised, but they get the liver if they go to the right one. When the hound goes to the right person almost infallibly, the number of people is increased, making the choice more difficult, and eventually the brief walks are extended into full trails.

=== Voice ===
A common misconception is that Bloodhounds are employed in packs; while this is sometimes the case in Britain, where foxhound blood is mixed into them to increase speed, in North America, Bloodhounds are used as solitary trackers. When they are on a trail, they are usually silent and do not give voice as do other scent hounds. The original use of the Bloodhound as a leash-hound, to find but not disturb animals, would require silent trailing.

Nevertheless, the Bloodhound bay is among the most impressive of hound voices. When hunting in a pack, they are expected to be in full cry. They are more likely to 'give tongue,' 'throw their tongue,' or 'speak' when hunting in a pack than when hunting singly, and more when hunting free than when on the leash. The quality of 'speaking to the line', that is giving tongue when on the correct scent while remaining silent when off it, is valued in British Bloodhound circles, on aesthetic grounds and because it makes it very easy to 'read' the hound's tracking behaviour. As a result, special trophies for speaking to the correct line are on offer at British working trials (where hounds hunt singly), although rarely awarded.

=== Trials in Britain ===
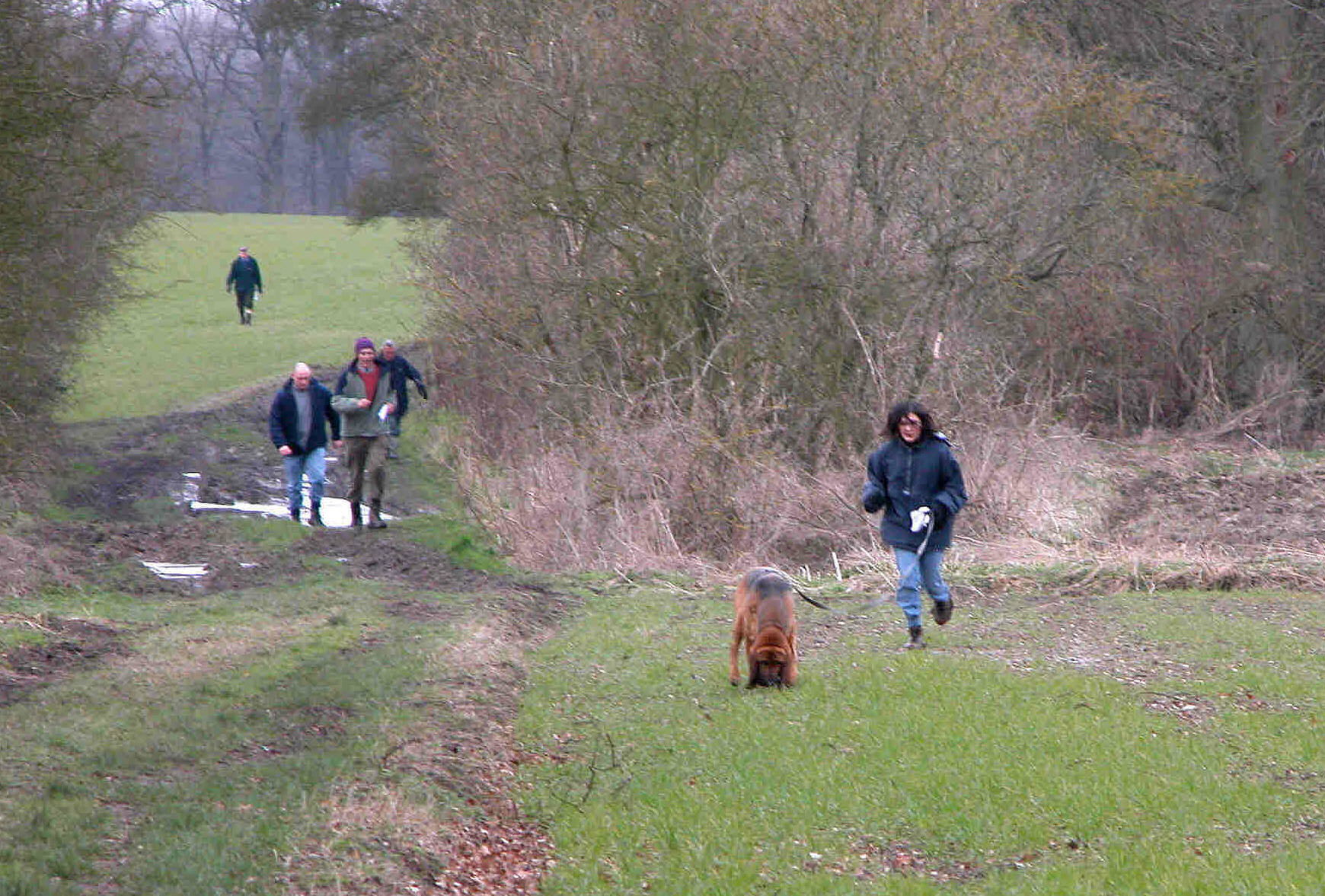
Bloodhound trial in the UK. Hound and handler approach their quarry (the photographer), with judges following behind.

Bloodhound Working Trials, first held in 1898, take place in Britain four times a year, under Kennel Club rules, organised by either the Association of Bloodhound Breeders, or The Bloodhound Club. They are run over farm land by permission of the landowners. A line walker (runner) is given a map, and sets off to follow a course marked on it, leaving a scent article ('smeller') attached to a flag marking the beginning of the trail. A hound and its handler start a set time later, and try to follow the trail, while the judge, equipped with a copy of the map, follows behind assessing their performance. When each of the entered hounds has completed a trail, the judge picks a winner. There are a series of 'stakes' of increasing difficulty, the simplest being 1 mile long, ½ an hour cold, and the hardest 3 miles long, 2 hours cold. On winning a stake, a hound moves up to the next one. Hounds may work unleashed if they have passed a test showing they will not bother livestock, especially sheep. Special prizes are on offer for identification and voice ('speaking to the line'). The best hounds may be invited to take part in special stakes, the most difficult being 3 miles long, 24 hours cold.

== Bloodhound packs ==
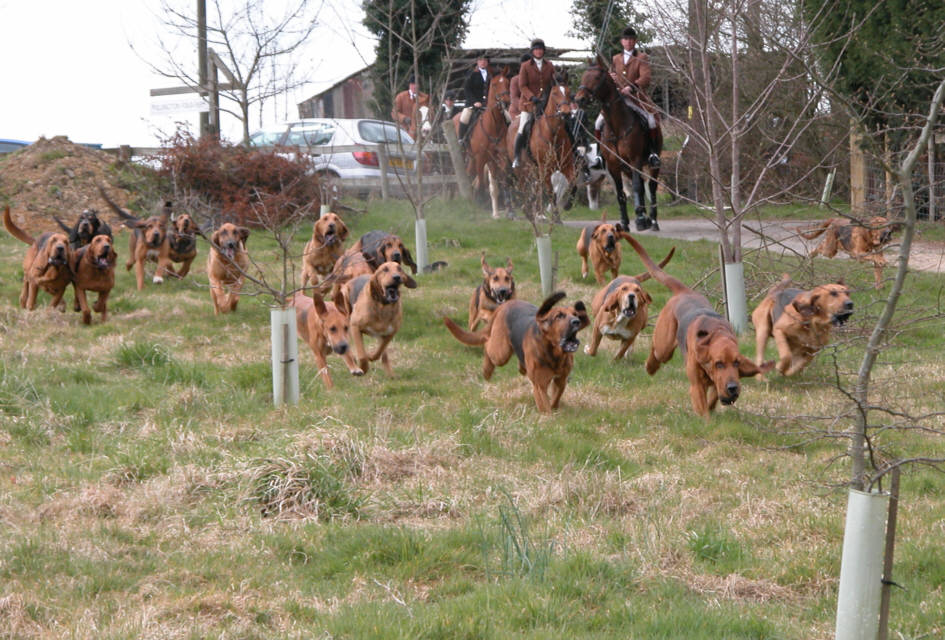
The Coakham pack of Bloodhounds starting a human trail in England

The medieval Bloodhound was not primarily a pack hound, but a leash hound, though there may have been packs in different places or at different times. Up to the 19th century, a single hound or a brace was used on deer parks, to find deer for the gun. However, mid-century two packs appeared, that of Thomas Neville, who hunted in the New Forest area, and who preferred very black hounds, and that of Lord Wolverton.

Both of these hunted semi-domesticated deer ('carted deer'), which were recaptured on being brought to bay and returned home. It was said of Lord Wolverton's hounds that he found it difficult to get them to hunt as a pack, because each liked to follow the scent on his own. Eventually, many were sold to Le Couteulx de Canteleu and taken to France.

Around the start of the 20th century, several packs existed briefly, following either deer, or the 'clean boot' – individual human scent without any enhancement such as animal blood or aniseed. Since the Second World War there have been several packs, including that of Eric Furness, who introduced a cross to a Dumfriesshire Black and Tan Foxhound into his Peak Bloodhounds.

Generally, masters of Bloodhounds since then maintain a level of out-cross breeding in their packs to improve speed and agility, while retaining Bloodhound type. These packs hunt the clean boot and are followed by a field on horseback.

== Noteworthy Bloodhounds ==
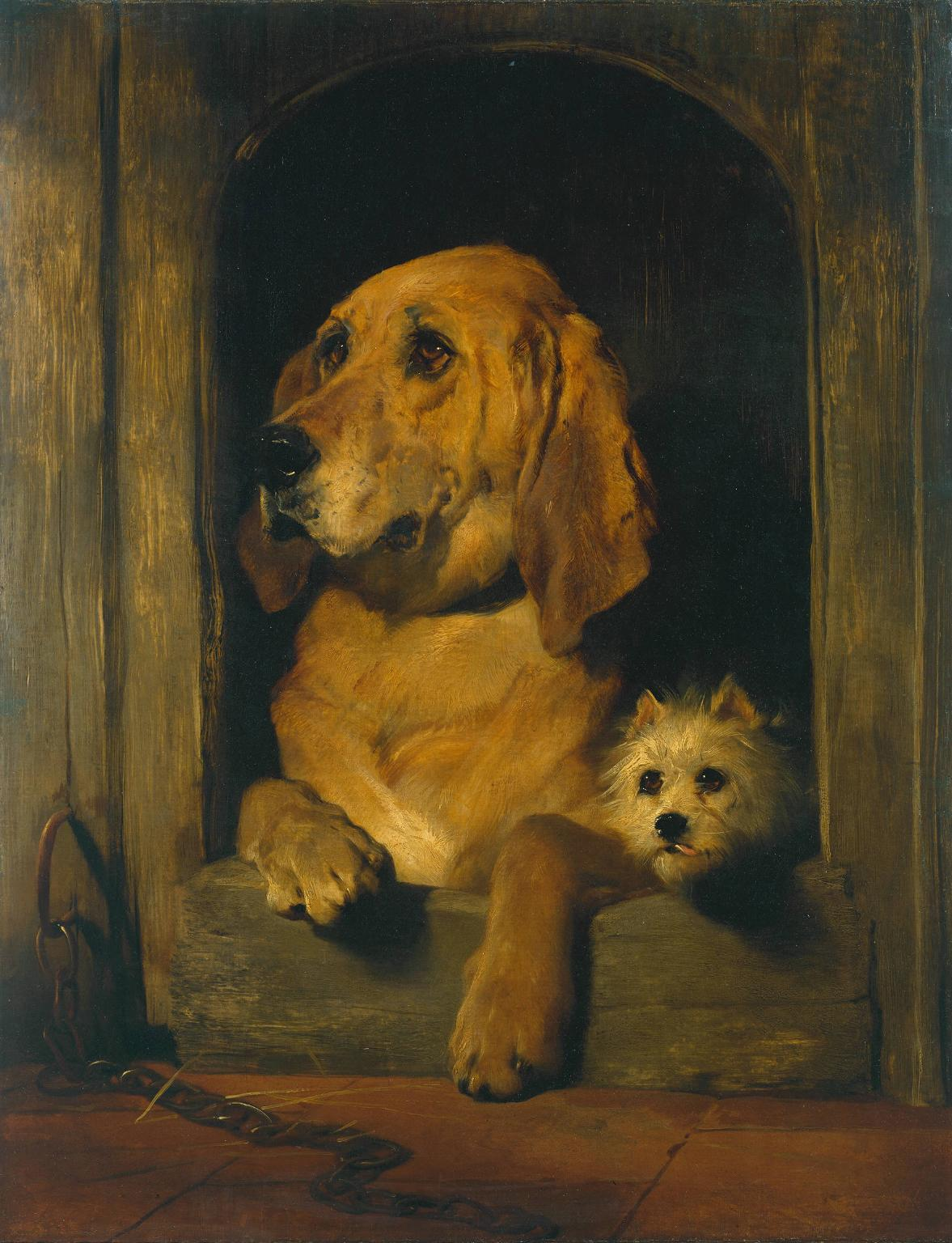
Dignity and Impudence by Edwin Landseer, 1839

Grafton was the Bloodhound in Landseer's famous painting Dignity and Impudence. Both dogs in the picture belonged to Jacob Bell.

Mr. T. A. Jennings' Ch Druid, known as 'Old Druid' was the first Bloodhound champion. Born in 1857, he was later bought by Emperor Napoleon III for his son, Prince Eugene Louis Jean Joseph, and taken to France. Photographs of him, of another famous hound, Cowen's Druid, and a bitch named Countess, appear in a rare book from 1865 in the British Library, and may be the oldest photographs of Bloodhounds to have survived.

A Bloodhound named Nick Carter is frequently cited as the archetype of the trailing Bloodhound and the extensive publicity this dog received may be the source of much Bloodhound-related folklore. Born in 1900, Nick Carter was owned and handled by Captain G. V. Mullikin of Lexington, Kentucky; he is credited with more than 650 finds, including one that required him to follow a trail 300 hours old; that is, 12 days.

Ch. Heathers Knock on Wood, known as Knotty, was one of the most awarded Bloodhounds of all time. He received more Best-in-Shows than any other Bloodhound, and is the first liver-and-tan Bloodhound ever to win a Best-in-Show. Knotty was awarded Best-in-Show at the Eukanuba Tournament in 2005 and won the Hound Group in the Westminster Kennel Club Show the same year. Knotty's offspring have also been show dogs, and as a result of many of his puppies receiving the title of "Champion" by the AKC, Knotty was inducted into the AKC's Stud Dog Hall of Fame. He died in the spring of 2008, from a rattlesnake's bite, which he suffered while trying to protect his owner from the snake.

On the popular 1960s sitcom The Beverly Hillbillies, veteran canine actor Stretch portrayed Jed Clampett's Bloodhound, Duke.

Ladybird on the popular animated sitcom King of the Hill is a purebred Georgia Bloodhound belonging to the Hill family.

The US Army 615th Military Police Company's mascot is a Bloodhound named for the company's pet and mascot during Vietnam named Andy.

McGruff the Crime Dog is the mascot of the US National Crime Prevention Council.

Trusty the bloodhound is a major supporting character in Walt Disney's 1955 animated film Lady and the Tramp. Other Disney animated films have also featured bloodhounds in more minor roles, notably Bruno in Cinderella, Towser in One Hundred and One Dalmatians, and Napoleon in The Aristocats.

Bloodhound

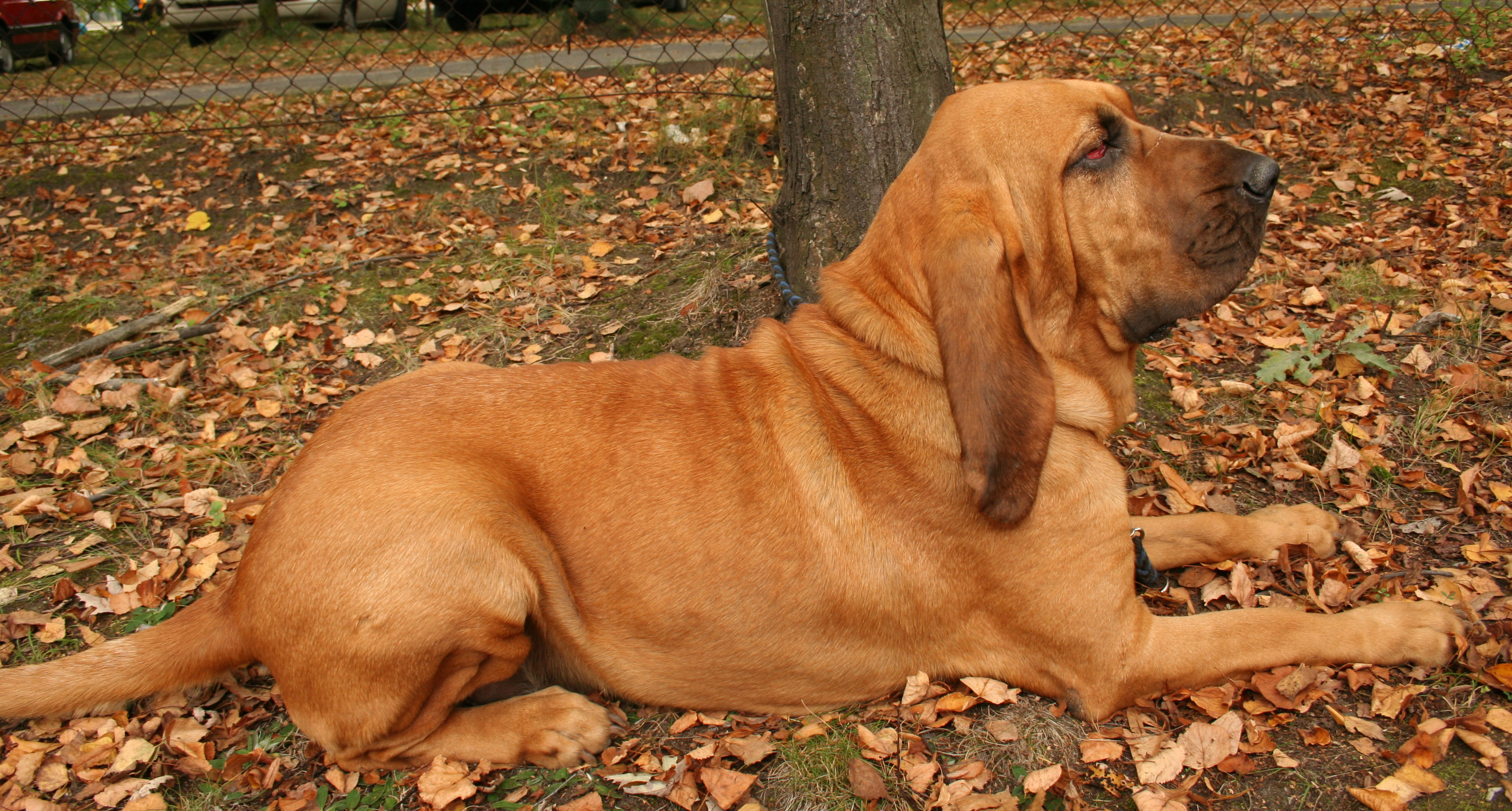
Bloodhound in Poland

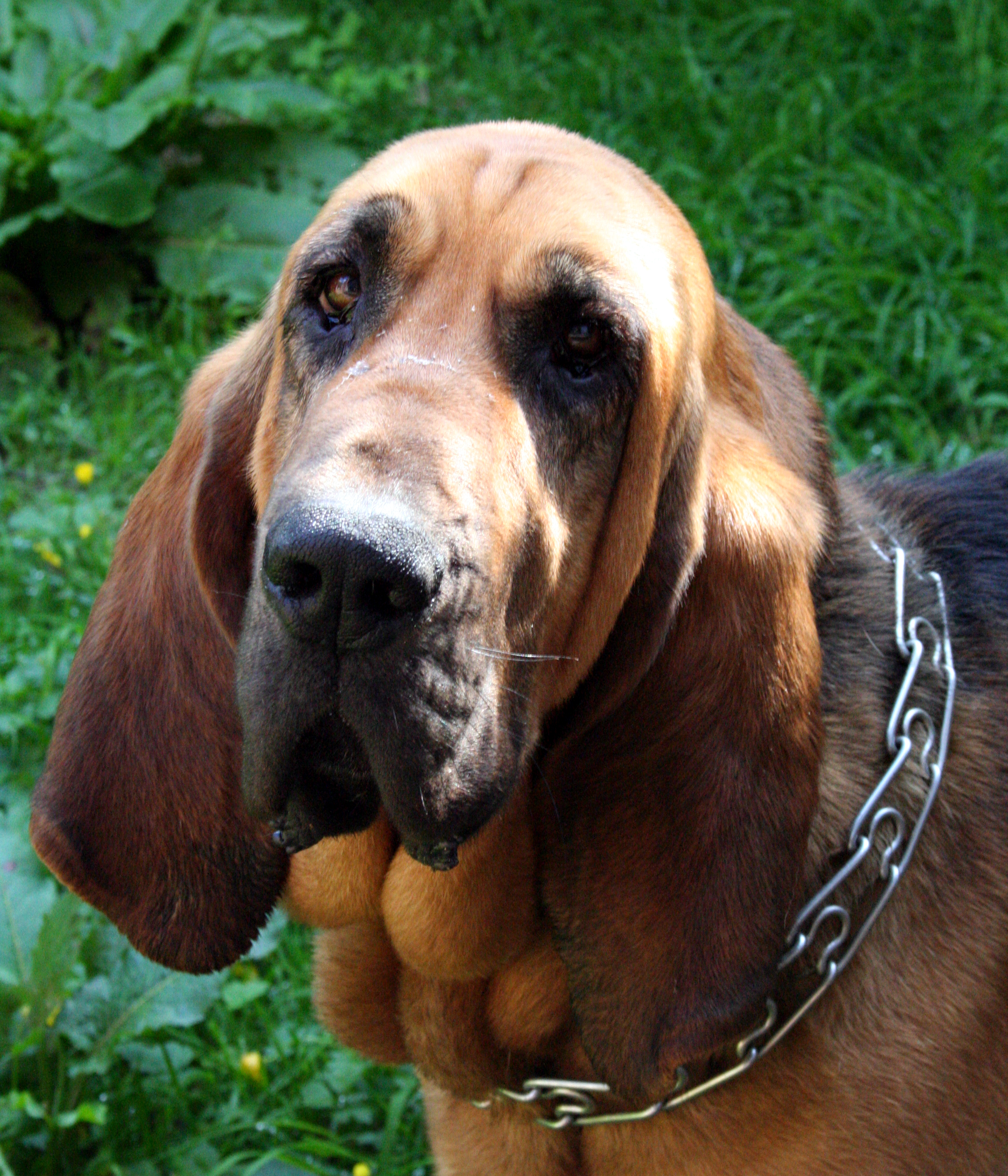
Bloodhound

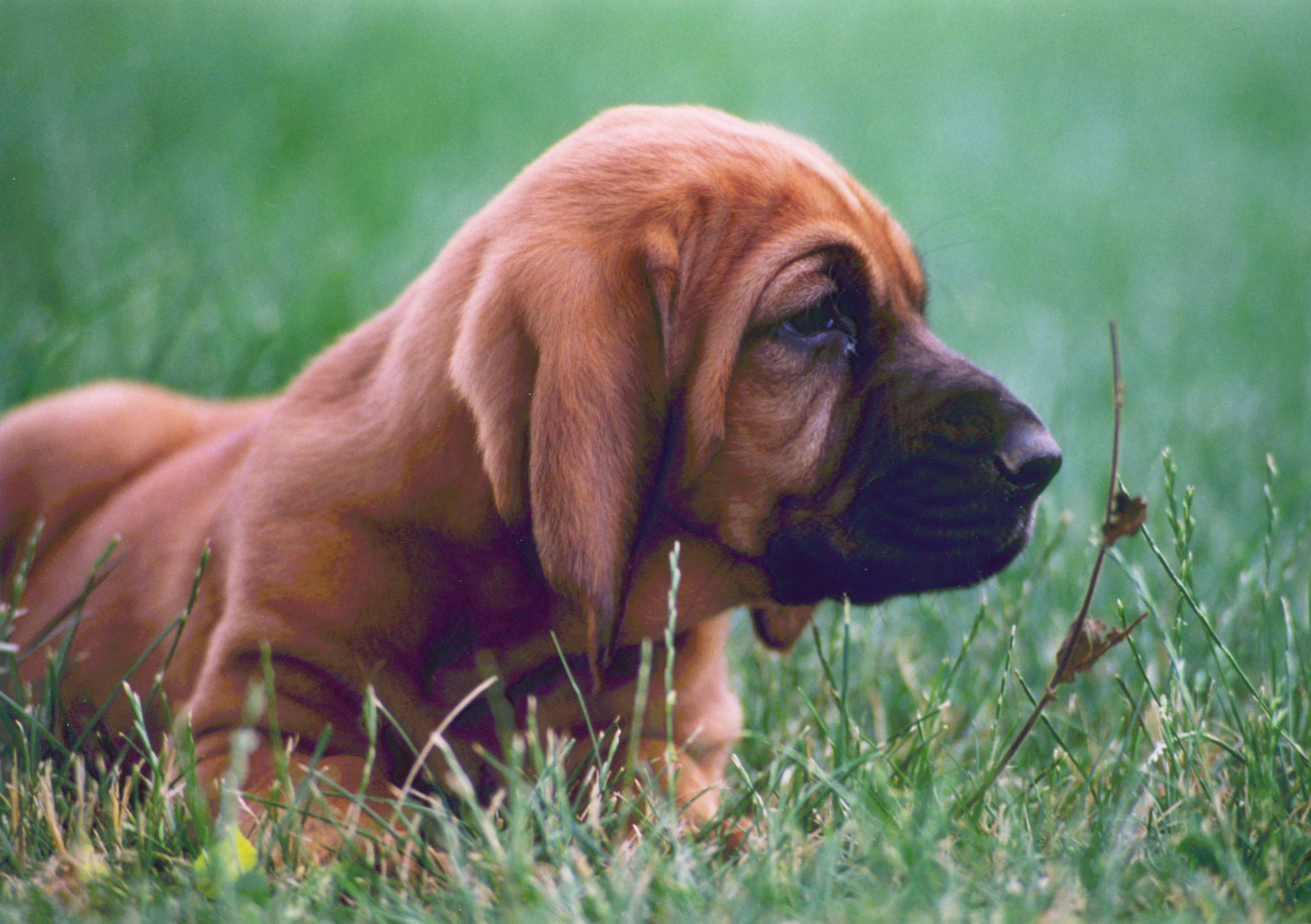
Bloodhound puppy

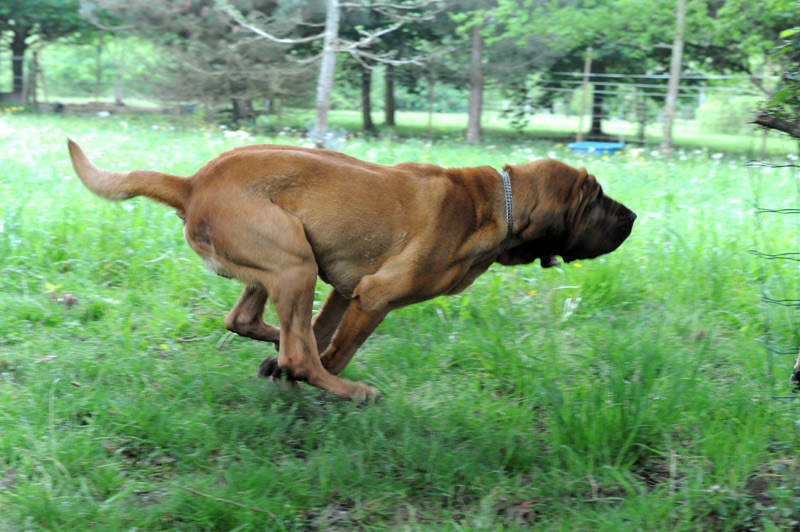
Bloodhound

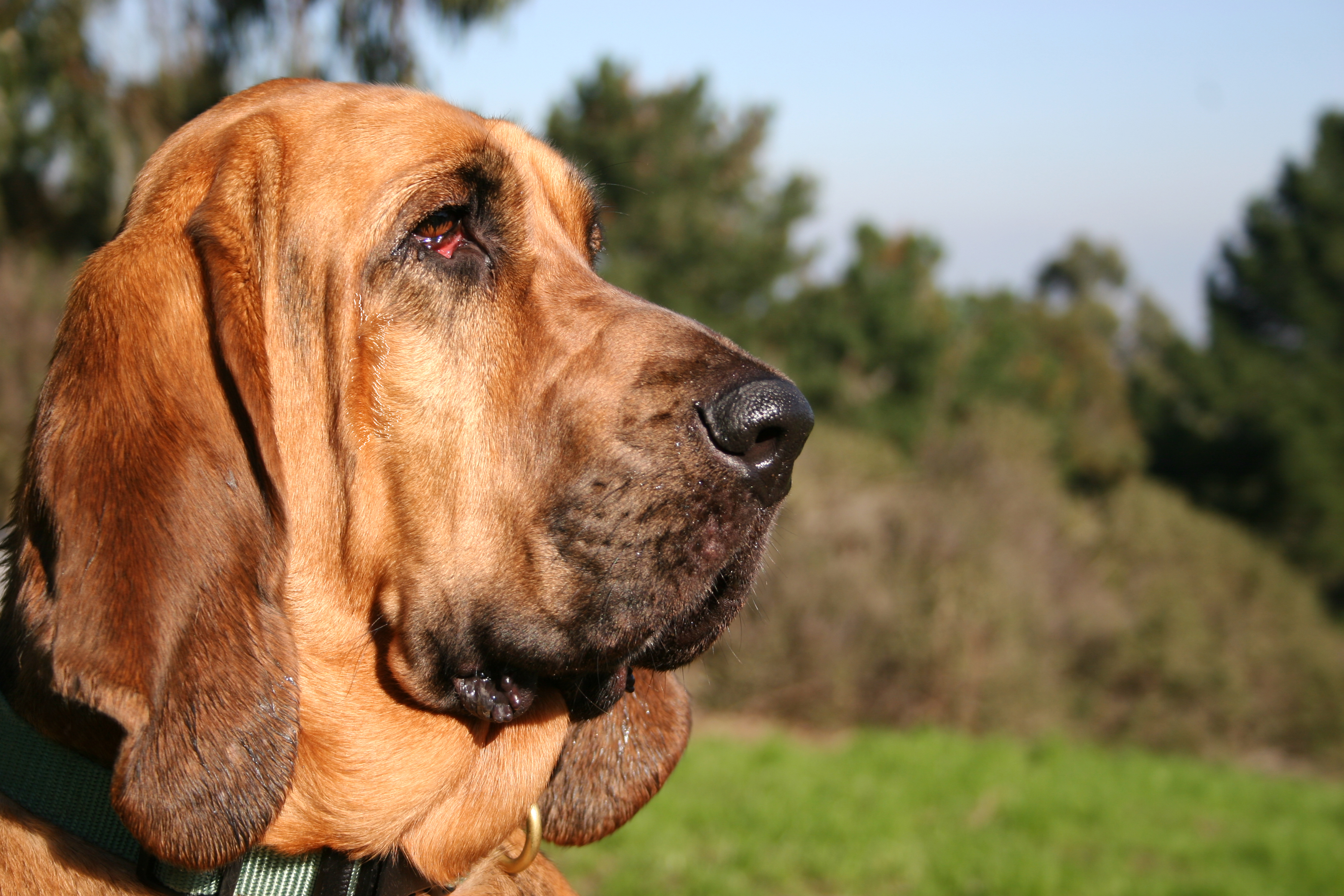
Bloodhound

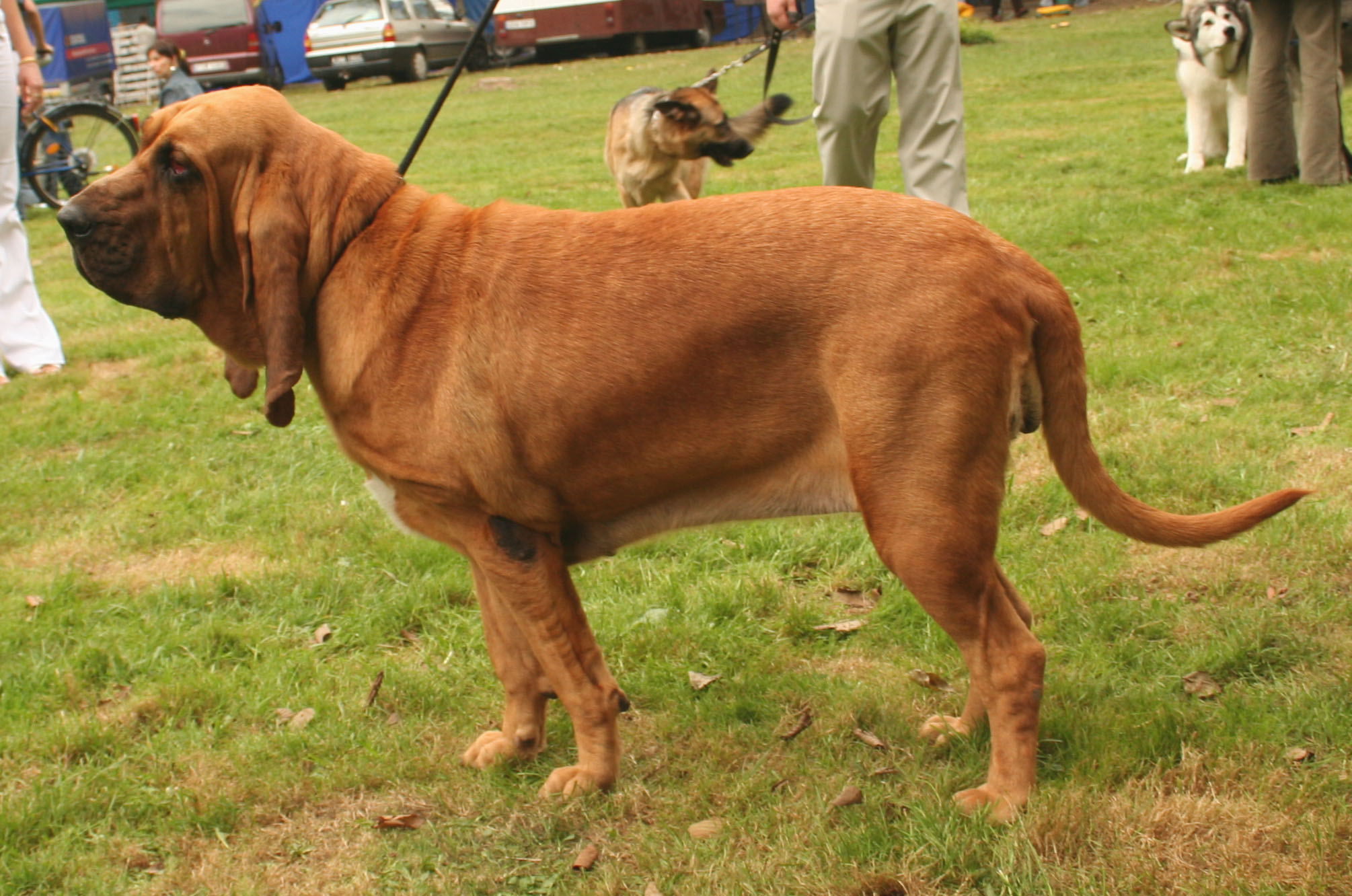
Bloodhound

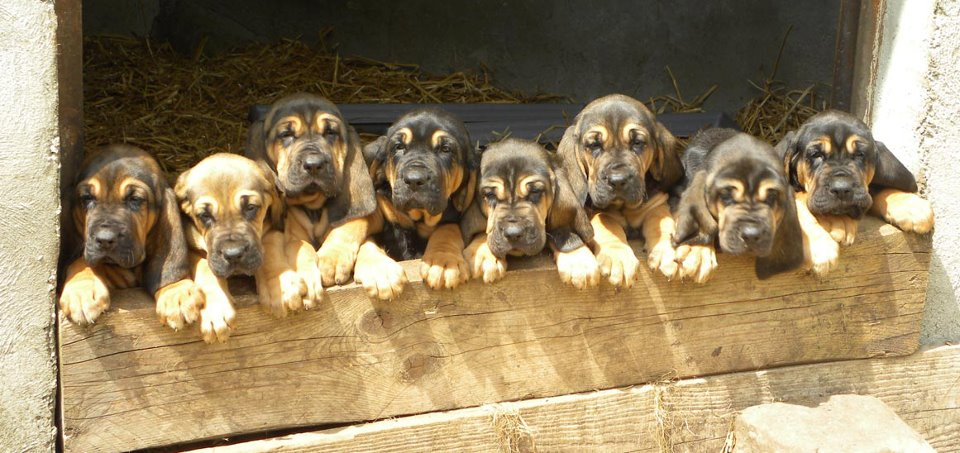
Bloodhound puppies

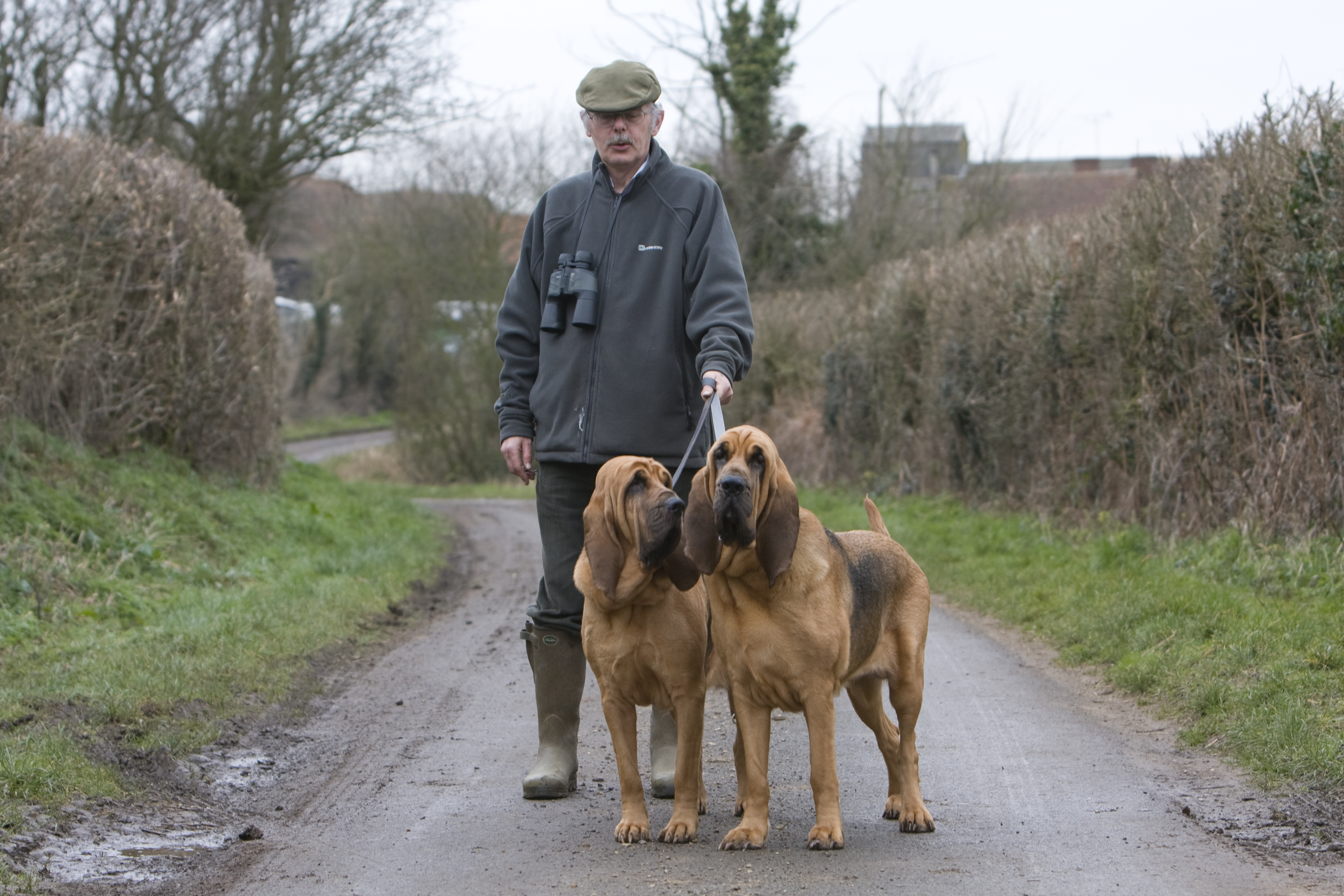
Bloodhound trials, Alton

== See also ==
- List of dog breeds
- Dog type
- Hunting the Clean Boot
- Northern (North Country Beagle) and Southern Hounds
