= The Railway Station =

1862 painting by William Powell Frith

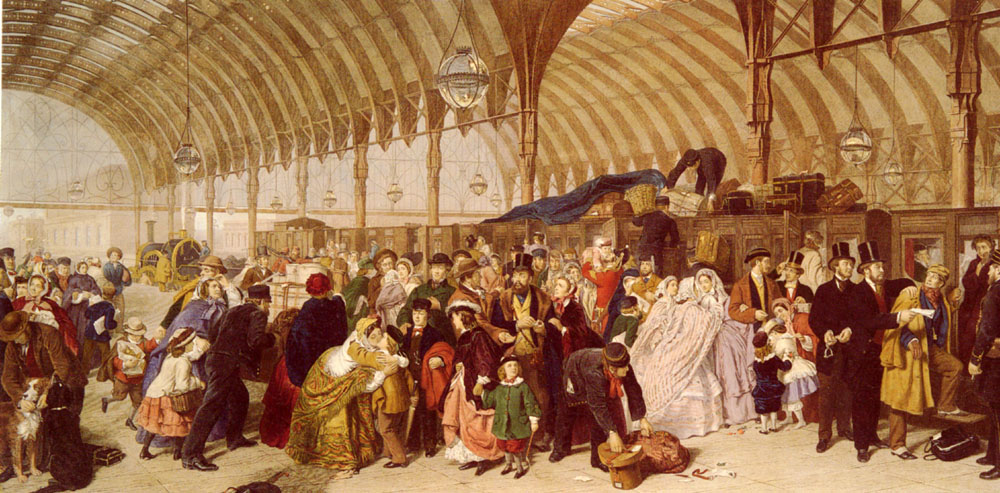
- Artist: William Powell Frith
- Year: 1862
- Type: Oil on canvas
- Dimensions: 54.1 cm × 114 cm (21.3 in × 45 in)
- Location: Royal Holloway College, Surrey

The Railway Station is an 1862 genre painting by the British artist William Powell Frith. The painting is held at Royal Holloway College, with a smaller version in the Royal Collection.

== Description ==
It depicts a scene at the busy Paddington Station, the terminus of the Great Western in London. Frith had developed a reputation for producing crowd scenes of everyday life, including Ramsgate Sands (1854) and The Derby Day (1858). Frith himself was doubtful about the potential work noting "I don't think the station at Paddington could be called picturesque, nor can the clothes of the ordinary traveller be said to offer much attraction to the painter", but was persuaded by his art dealer Louis Flatow who offered him reportedly the largest commission fee ever offered to an artist.

The panorama represents all social classes of Victorian society, using the still relatively new railway system. On the right, two detectives are arresting a man as he attempts to board a train.

== Bibliography ==
- Bills, Mark; Knight, Vivien (2006). William Powell Frith: Painting the Victorian Age. Yale University Press. ISBN 9780300121902.
- Green, Oliver (2021). London's Great Railway Stations. Yale University Press. ISBN 9780300121902.
- Green, Richard; Sellars, Jane (2019). William Powell Frith: The People's Painter. Bloomsbury USA. ISBN 9781781300916.
