= Dignity and Impudence =

Painting by Edwin Landseer

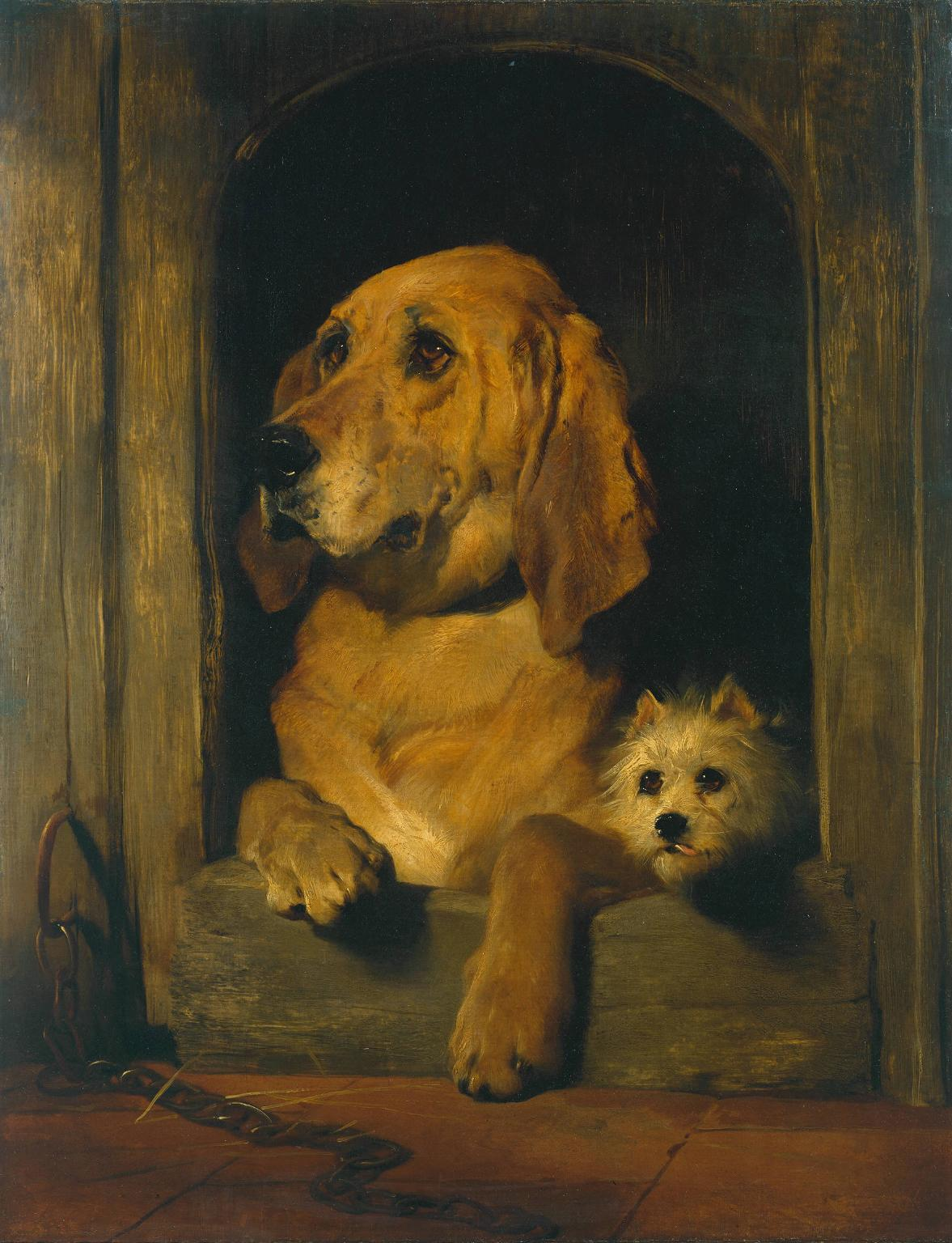
- Artist: Edwin Landseer
- Year: 1839
- Type: Oil on canvas, genre painting
- Dimensions: 88.9 cm × 69.2 cm (35.0 in × 27.2 in)
- Location: Tate Britain; London

Dignity and Impudence is an 1839 oil painting by the British artist Edwin Landseer. It features a bloodhound and a much smaller West Highland terrier side by side, their sharply contrasting personalities reflected by the title. The dogs, named Grafton and Scratch, respectively, belonged to the chemist and politician Jacob Bell, who commissioned the picture.

Landseer was a noted animal painter and Bell collected several of his works. This has become one of Landseer's best-known and most popular paintings of dogs.

The painting was displayed at the British Institution's 1839 exhibition in Pall Mall and later featured at the Manchester Art Treasures Exhibition of 1857. It was donated by Bell to the National Gallery in 1859. It was later transferred to the collection of the Tate Britain in Pimlico.

== Bibliography ==
- Donald, Diana. Picturing Animals in Britain, 1750-1850. Yale University Press, 2007.
- Horn, Pamela. Pleasures and Pastimes in Victorian Britain. Amberley Publishing, 2011.
- Ormond, Richard. Sir Edwin Landseer. Philadelphia Museum of Art, 1981.
