= Ramsgate Sands =

Painting by William Powell Frith

- Life at the Seaside
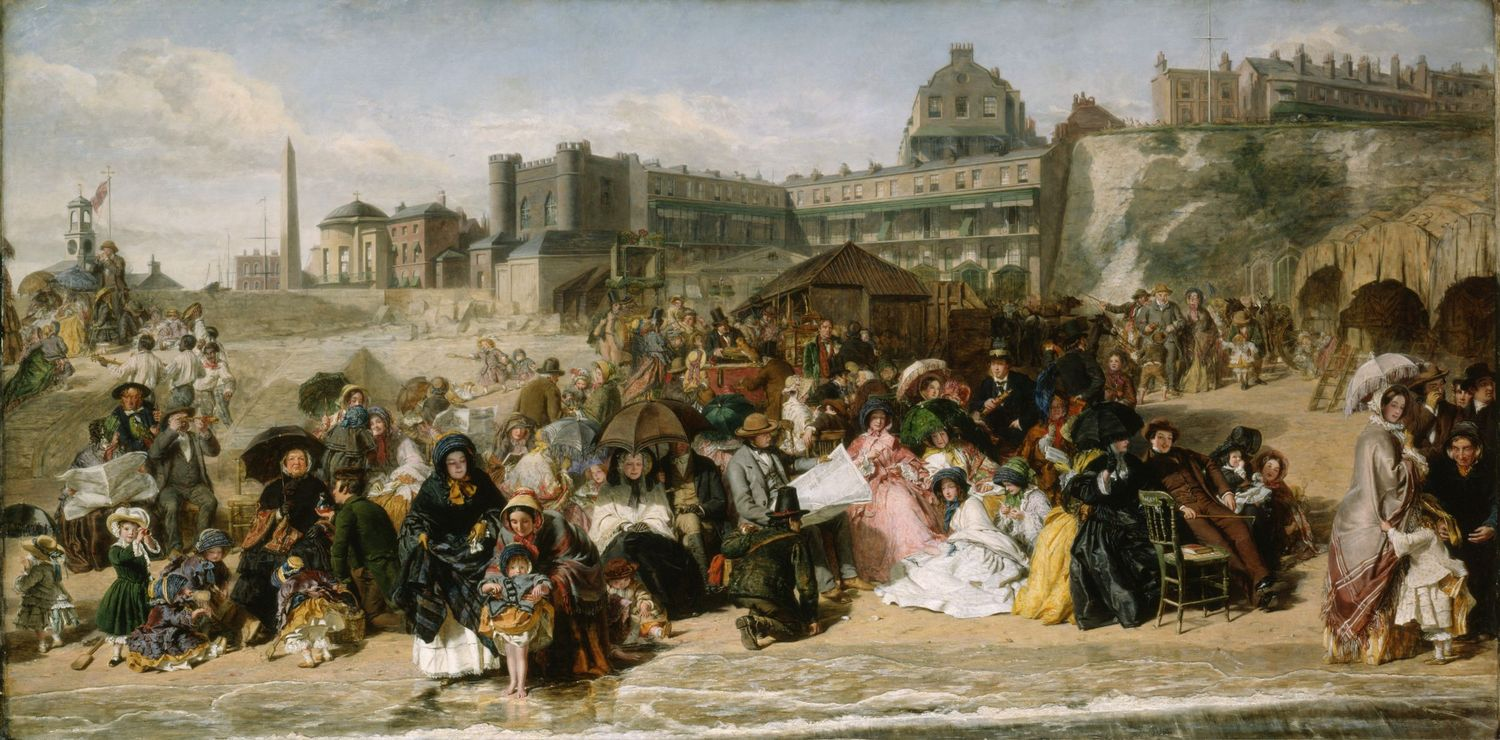
- Artist: William Powell Frith
- Year: 1851–1854
- Medium: Oil-on-canvas
- Subject: Holidaymakers on the beach at Ramsgate.
- Dimensions: 77.0 cm × 155.1 cm (30.3 in × 61.1 in)
- Owner: Royal Collection
- Accession: RCIN 405068

Ramsgate Sands, also known as Life at the Seaside, is an oil-on-canvas painting by the English artist William Powell Frith, who worked on it from 1851 to 1854. The painting, which depicts a beach scene in Ramsgate, was Frith's first great commercial success: it was exhibited at the Royal Academy summer exhibition in 1854, and bought by Queen Victoria. Frith made a series of similar pictures, showing groups of people in contemporary scenes, including The Derby Day of 1858, The Railway Station of 1862, and Private View at the Royal Academy of 1883.

== Background ==
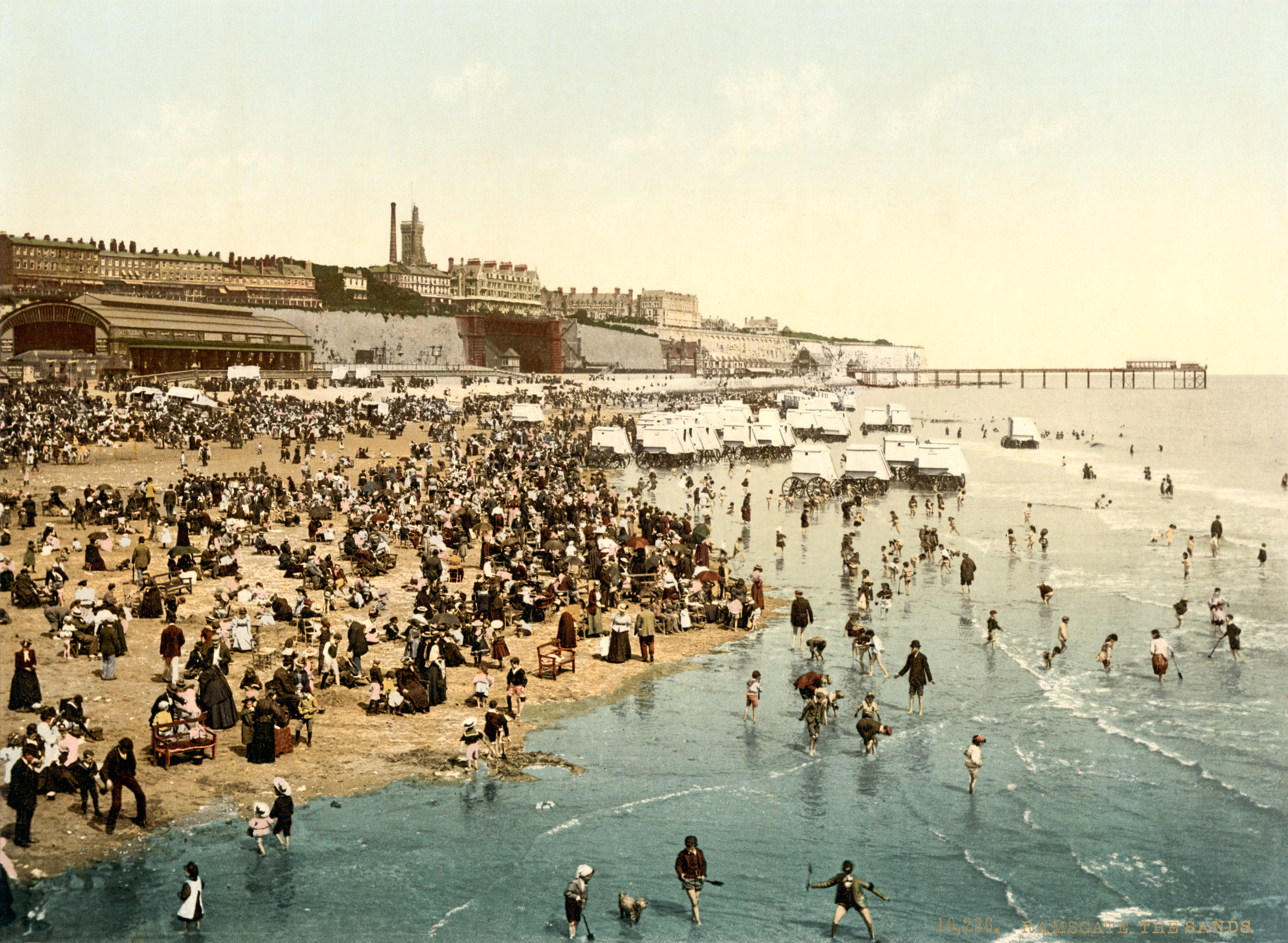
Ramsgate in 1899

After the South Eastern Railway reached Ramsgate Town railway station in 1846, the town of Ramsgate rapidly became a popular destination for day trips from London. Frith was already a successful artist. He became a member of the Royal Academy in 1853, and the painting was based on studies made by Frith during a holiday in Ramsgate in September 1851, where he was inspired by the variety of everyday life. Dunedin Public Art Gallery holds an oil sketch from 1851–52.

== Description ==
Frith takes advantage of the location to paint people of different social classes in contemporary modern dress. The seaside was a place where the different classes, ages, and sexes could mix without the usual barriers. Frith populates the painting with a variety of stock characters – a grandmother with a parasol, a gentleman seated reading a newspaper, an over-dressed "swell", a variety of entertainers and vendors. Frith also included a self-portrait: he is looking over the shoulder of the man on the far right, with two ladies and a girl in white in front. The small girl paddling in the sea near the centre of the painting, staring directly out of the picture, is thought to be his daughter. All are viewed from the sea, looking towards the beach, separating the viewer from the scene. Many of the buildings in the background – the clock tower, the granite obelisk erected in 1822, building with battlements on Harbour Parade, and the gable end of the building at the junction of Albion Place and Madeira Walk above the cliffs – remain recognisable today.

Unusually, to modern eyes, the characters are wearing their usual clothes on the beach, including crinolines for the women and waistcoats for the men, alongside more recognisable seaside images of sandcastles, donkey rides, and a Punch and Judy show. Two telescopes hint at people-watching or voyeurism (the morality of women observing men bathing was a contemporary issue, particularly as men often bathed naked). Bathing machines are visible in the background, but the painting shows no bathers, only genteel paddling at the edge of the sea.

The painting measures 77 × 155.1 centimetres (30.3 × 61.1 in). The back of the painting bears the inscription "Life at the Sea side".

== Reception ==
The painting received a mixed reception. It was dismissed by one contemporary commentator as "vulgar Cockney business" or a "tissue of vulgarity" and it was rejected by several potential buyers before it was exhibited at the Royal Academy summer exhibition in 1854.

However, it became very popular with the viewing public at the exhibition, and it was praised by critics for its realistic depiction of modern life. It was voted the "picture of the year" by the journal Royal Academy Pictures and was purchased by the printers Lloyd Brothers for 1,000 guineas. When Queen Victoria expressed an interest in buying the painting – she had visited Ramsgate several times in the 1820s and 1830s, staying at Townley House and Albion House – it was sold for the same price to her, and displayed at Osborne House.

Lloyd Brothers retained the right to reproduce the painting as an engraving for sale to the public as prints, and Frith may have earned as much as £3,000 from the sales.

A smaller, much later replica by Frith is in the collection of the Russell-Cotes Art Gallery in Bournemouth.
