= Chien-gris =

Extinct dog breed

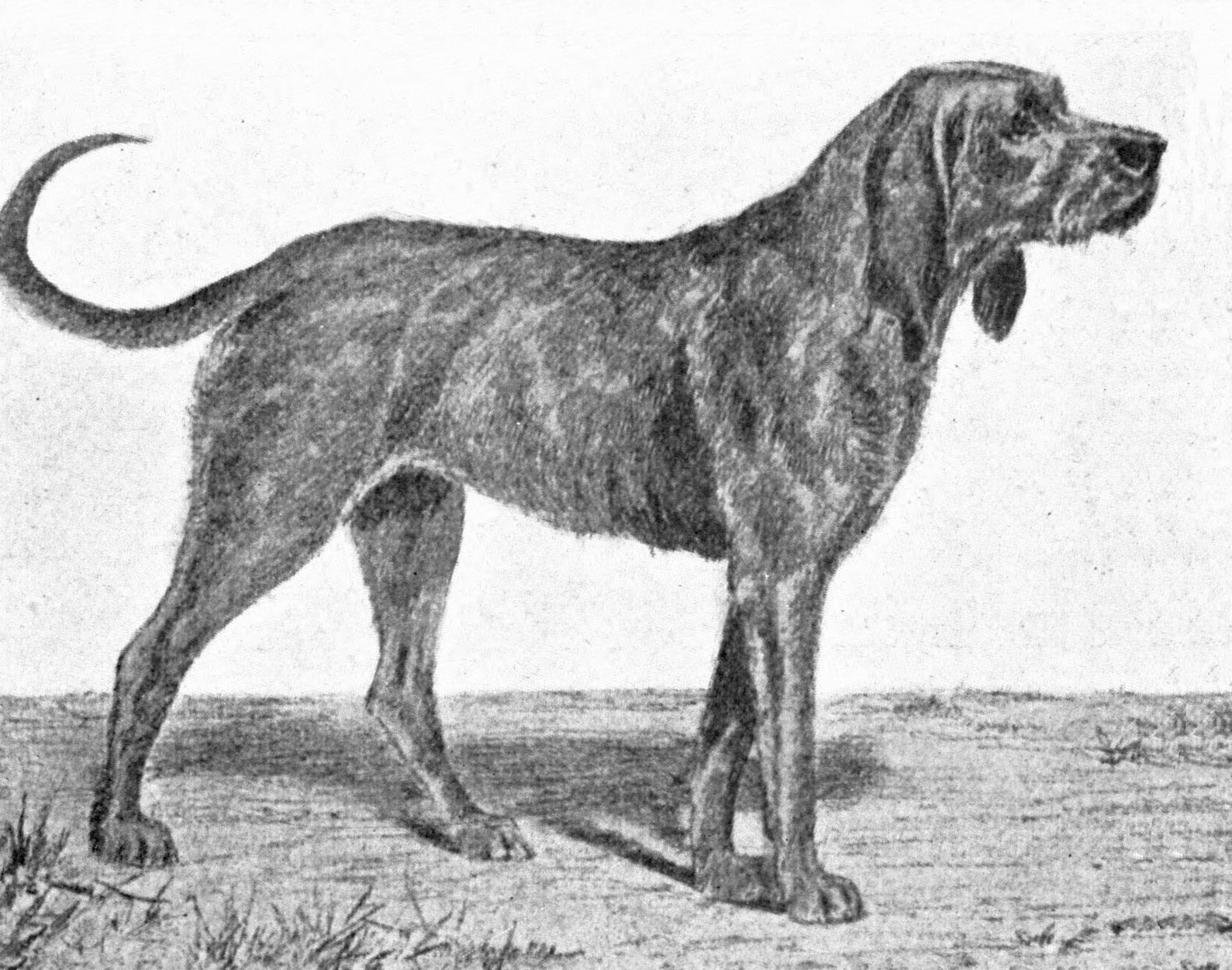
- Other names: Gris de Saint-Louis (Grey Saint Louis Hound), dun hound
- Origin: France
- Breed status: Extinct

The Chien-gris a.k.a. Gris de Saint-Louis (Grey Saint Louis Hound) is an extinct breed of dog which originated in Medieval times. Like the Chien de Saint-Hubert, it was a scent hound, and formed part of the royal packs of France, which were composed, from about 1250 till 1470, exclusively of hounds of this type. According to King Charles IX, (1550–1574) they supposedly were introduced to France through Saint Louis (i.e. King Louis IX, 1226–1270), who had encountered these hounds while a prisoner during the Crusades, and subsequently received some as a gift. Old writers on hunting liked to ascribe an ancient and remote origin to their hounds, and these were claimed to be originally from Tartary. They were large, and, even though they did not have such good noses, were preferred by the Kings to the St Huberts, which were said to be only of medium size.

Jacques du Fouilloux, in the 16th century, says they were common, and describes them as 'gris' (grey) on the back with forequarters and legs tan or red, some having near black hair on the back. They were roughhaired, and were ancestors of the modern French rough-coated Griffon breeds. However the rough coats were not mentioned by Charles IX or du Fouilloux, and it has been suggested they were acquired later through interbreeding with indigenous French hounds. They were headstrong, wide-casting hounds, inclined to change or overshoot, but determined in their pursuit of a quarry to the death. However, by the nineteenth century, like the St Hubert, they had become virtually impossible to find, because of mixed breeding and the effect of the Revolution on French hunting.

George Turberville translated du Fouilloux' book on hunting into English, and used the term 'Dun hound' to translate 'Chien-gris'. It is presumed he did not translate it literally as 'grey-hound' to avoid confusion. One finds the term 'dun hound' in some subsequent writing in English, suggesting that the kind also existed in Britain, and it has been supposed that these 'dun hounds' went into the makeup of the Bloodhound, accounting for the 'badgering' of the hair in the saddles of some bloodhounds. However, Turberville did not make it clear that his book was a translation, and it is highly possible that people mistakenly believed his work was about English hunting. Early references to the dun hound may simply come from people relying, like Nicolas Cox, on Turberville, and it is quite possible that the dun hound was never a significant animal in British hunting.

== See also ==
- List of dog breeds
- List of extinct dog breeds
