= Jacob Bell (chemist) =

British politician, pharmacist and chemist (1810–1859)

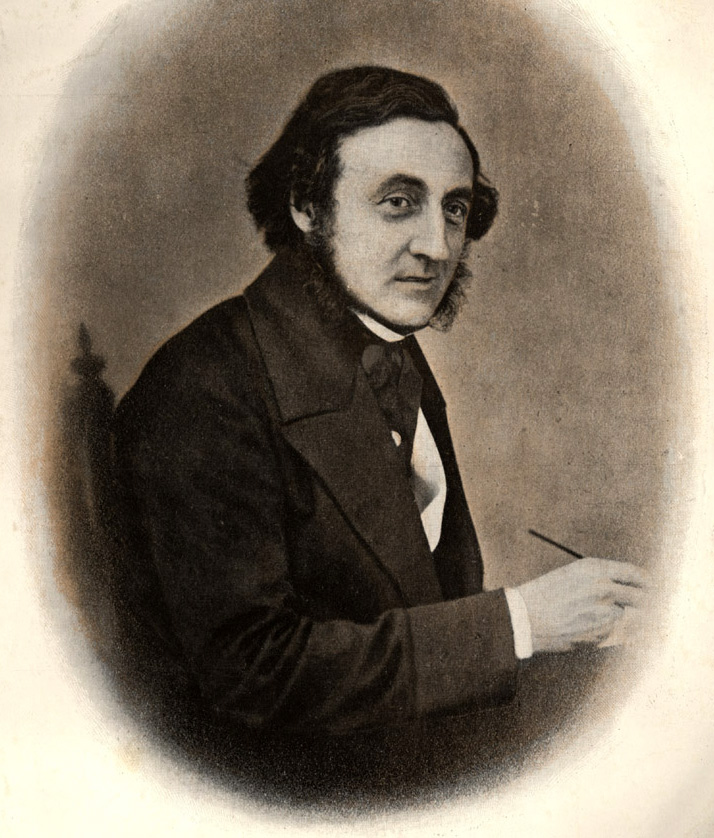
- Portrait of Jacob Bell
- Born: 5 March 1810; London, England
- Died: 12 June 1859 (aged 49)
- Political party: Whig
- Scientific career
- Education: Royal Institution; King's College London
- Workplaces: Pharmaceutical Society of Great Britain

Jacob Bell (5 March 1810 – 12 June 1859) was a British pharmaceutical chemist who worked to reform the profession. He served as a Whig Member of Parliament (MP) for St Albans from 1850 to 1852.

== Career ==
Bell was born in London, one of the six children of John Bell (1774–1849) and Eliza Smith (died 1839), his wife.

On the completion of his education, he joined his father in business as a chemist in Oxford Street, and at the same time attended chemistry lectures at the Royal Institution, and those on medicine at King's College London.

Always keenly alive to the interests of chemists in general, Bell conceived the idea of a society which should at once protect the interests of the trade, and improve its status, and at a public meeting held on 15 April 1841, it was resolved to found the Pharmaceutical Society of Great Britain.

Bell carried his scheme through in the face of many difficulties, and further advanced the cause of pharmacy by establishing the Pharmaceutical Journal, and superintending its publication for eighteen years. The Pharmaceutical Society was incorporated by royal charter in 1843.

One of the first abuses to engage the attention of the new body was the practice of pharmacy by unqualified persons, and in 1845 Bell drew up the draft of a bill to deal with the matter, one of the provisions of which was the recognition of the Pharmaceutical Society as the governing body in all questions connected with pharmacy. For some time after this the question of pharmaceutical legislation was widely discussed.

In December 1850, Bell successfully contested a by-election in the borough of St Albans in order that he might be able to advocate his proposals for reform more effectually in parliament. In 1851 he brought forward a bill embodying these proposals. It passed its second reading, but was considerably whittled down in committee, and when eventually it became law it only partially represented its sponsor's intentions. Bell was the author of an Historical Sketch of the Progress of Pharmacy in Great Britain.

St Albans was disenfranchised for corruption in May 1852, and at the general election in July 1852 Bell stood unsuccessfully in Great Marlow. He stood again one more time, at a by-election in December 1854 for the borough of Marylebone, but did not win the seat.

His brother James was also a Liberal MP, from 1852 to 1857.

He was a friend of Edwin Landseer and a dog-lover: he owned both the dogs in Landseer's famous painting Dignity and Impudence. Bell bought William Powell Frith's painting The Derby Day from the artist in 1858 for £1,500, and left it to the National Gallery on his death in the following year, 12 June 1859.

== Bibliography ==
- Craig, F. W. S. (1989) [1977]. British parliamentary election results 1832–1885 (2nd ed.). Chichester: Parliamentary Research Services. p. 261. ISBN 0-900178-26-4.
- Smith, George Barnett (1885). "Bell, Jacob" . In Stephen, Leslie (ed.). Dictionary of National Biography. Vol. 4. London: Smith, Elder & Co.

Parliament of the United Kingdom
Preceded by George Repton and Alexander Raphael	Member of Parliament for St Albans; 1850 – 1852; With: George Repton	Constituency disenfranchised
