= The Derby Day =

Painting by William Powell Frith

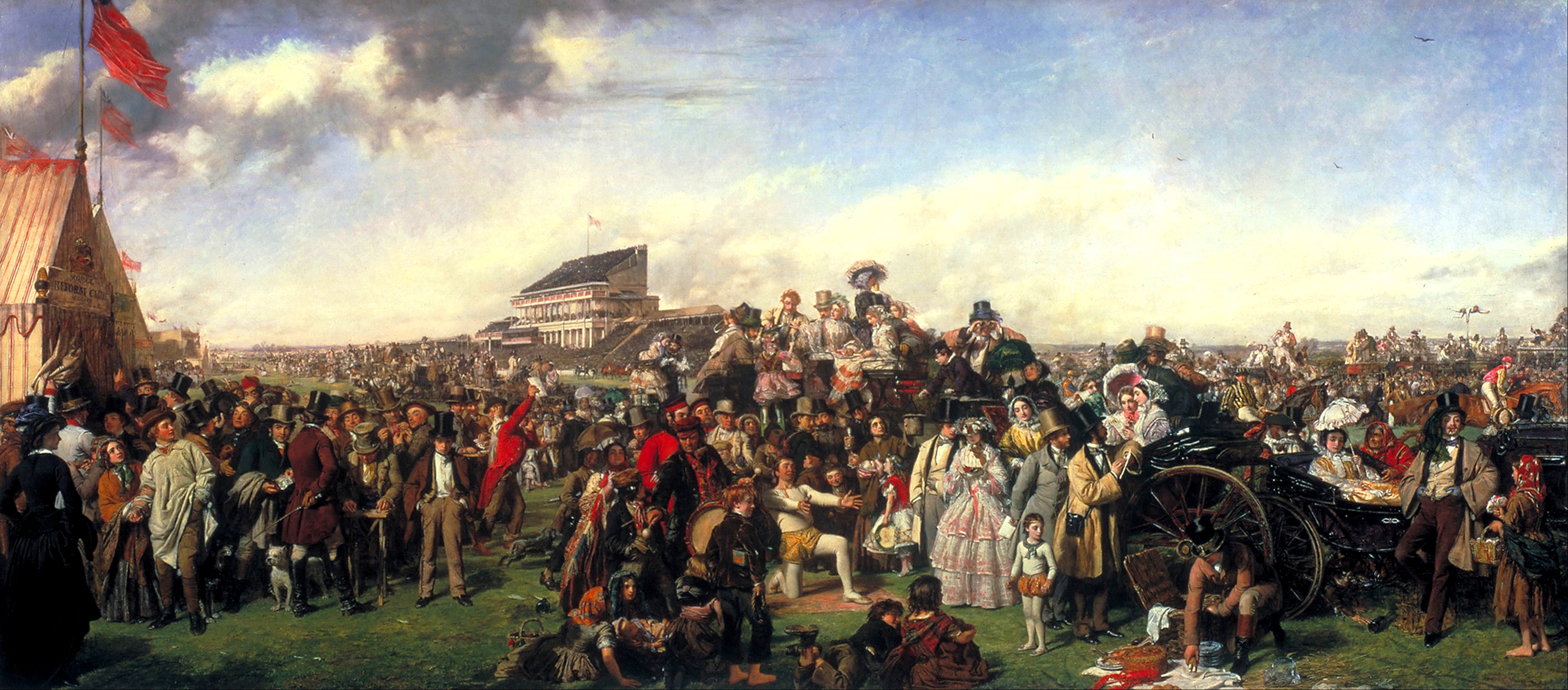
- Artist: William Powell Frith
- Year: 1856-1858
- Medium: Oil-on-canvas
- Dimensions: 101.6 cm × 223.5 cm (40.0 in × 88.0 in)
- Location: Tate Britain, London

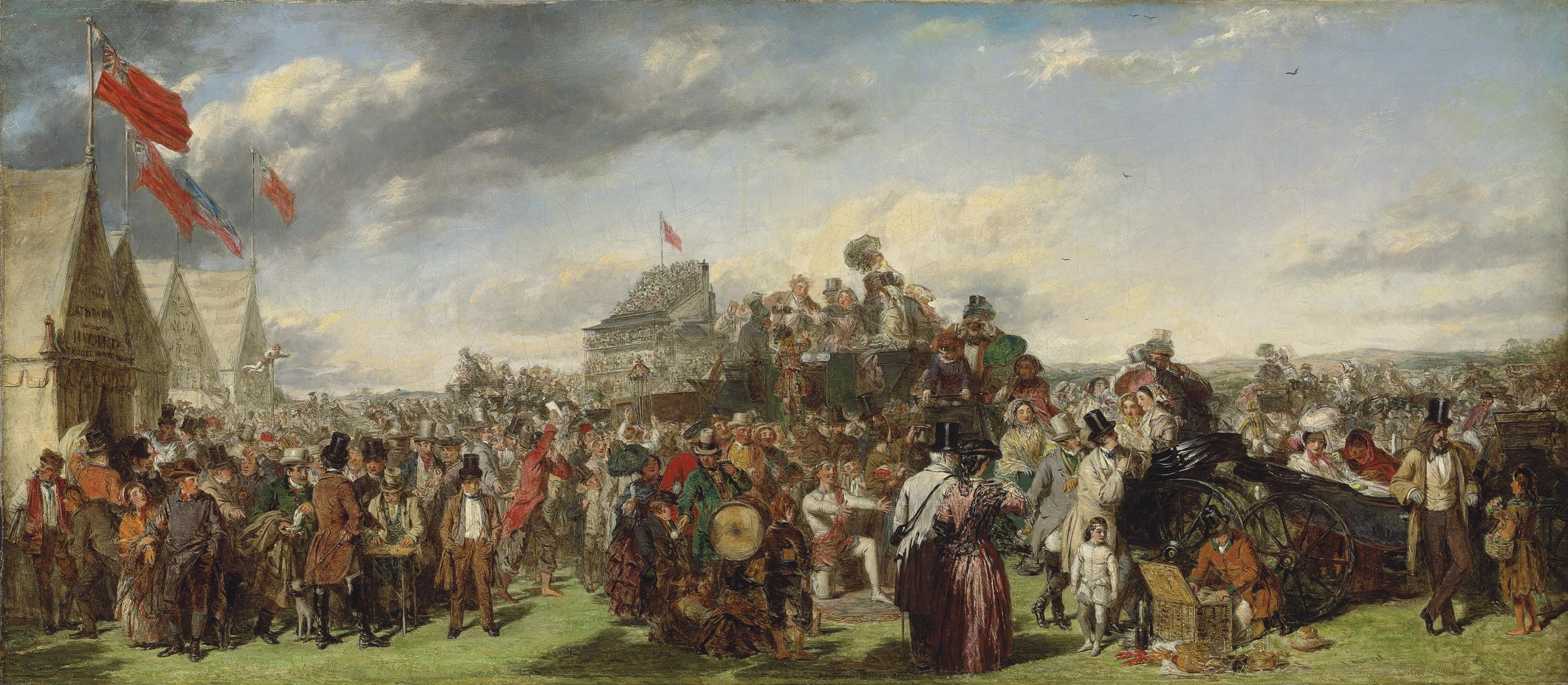
Frith's much smaller "first study" for the painting, sold for £505,250 in December 2011.

The Derby Day is a large oil painting showing a panoramic view of Epsom Derby, painted by the English artist William Powell Frith over 15 months from 1856 to 1858. It has been described by Christie's as Frith's "undisputed masterpiece" and also "arguably the definitive example of Victorian modern-life genre."

The original version is in Tate Britain, in London. As with many of Frith's works, he painted a second version many years later, which is in the Manchester Art Gallery. A smaller oil study was sold in 2011.

== The painting ==
The painting measures 40 inches (100 cm) by 88 inches (220 cm) and gives a satirical view of Victorian society. It includes three main scenes, during the annual spectacle of the Derby, when large numbers of Londoners left town for the day to visit the races on Epsom Downs Racecourse, presenting a cross-section of society in a contemporary saturnalian revel. Earlier pictures of the Derby crowds were drawn by illustrators such as John Leech or Dickie Doyle.

On the left, near the private tent of the Reform Club, rich city gentlemen in top hats surround the table of a thimble-rigger who is busy cheating them out of their money. To the right, one stands with his hands in his empty pockets, and shirt gaping, having gambled away his pocketwatch, its curb chain and his shirt-studs. In Frith's 1895, My Autobiography and Reminiscences, the painter-turned-memorialist leaves an account of his encounter with a thimble-rig team (operator and accomplices):

My first visit to Epsom was in the May of 1856 – Blink Bonnie's year. My first Derby had no interest for me as a race, but as giving me the opportunity of studying life and character it is ever to be gratefully remembered. Gambling-tents and thimble-rigging, prick in the garter and the three-card trick, had not then been stopped by the police. So convinced was I that I could find the pea under the thimble that I was on the point of backing my guess rather heavily, when I was stopped by Egg [Frith’s companion], whose interference was resented by a clerical-looking personage, in language much opposed to what would have been anticipated from one of his cloth.

'You,' said Egg, addressing the divine, 'you are a confederate, you know; my friend is not to be taken in.' 'Look here,' said the clergyman, 'don't you call names, and don't call me names, or I shall knock your d – d head off.' 'Will you?' said Egg, his courage rising as he saw two policemen approaching. 'Then I call the lot of you – the Quaker there, no more a Quaker than I am, and that fellow that thinks he looks like a farmer – you are a parcel of thieves!' 'So they are, sir,' said a meek-looking lad who joined us; 'they have cleaned me out.'

'Now move off; clear out of this!' said the police; and the gang walked away, the clergyman turning and extending his arms in the act of blessing me and Egg.

Further left, a young country man in smock is being held back by his woman to prevent him from joining in. In the centre, an acrobat is ready to perform with his son, but the attention of the thin young boy has been distracted by a lavish picnic banquet that is being laid out. Spectators throng behind, drinking champagne in their carriages, with the racecourse grandstand visible in the background. At the far right, a well-dressed man leans against the carriage of his young mistress. Echoing her position, a high-class prostitute in black riding clothes is on the extreme left, one of many that could be seen each day riding in Hyde Park. To the right, a thief can be seen stealing a gold watch from a man with his hands in his pockets. Also visible are a group of musicians, a group of beggars, and street vendors selling their wares.

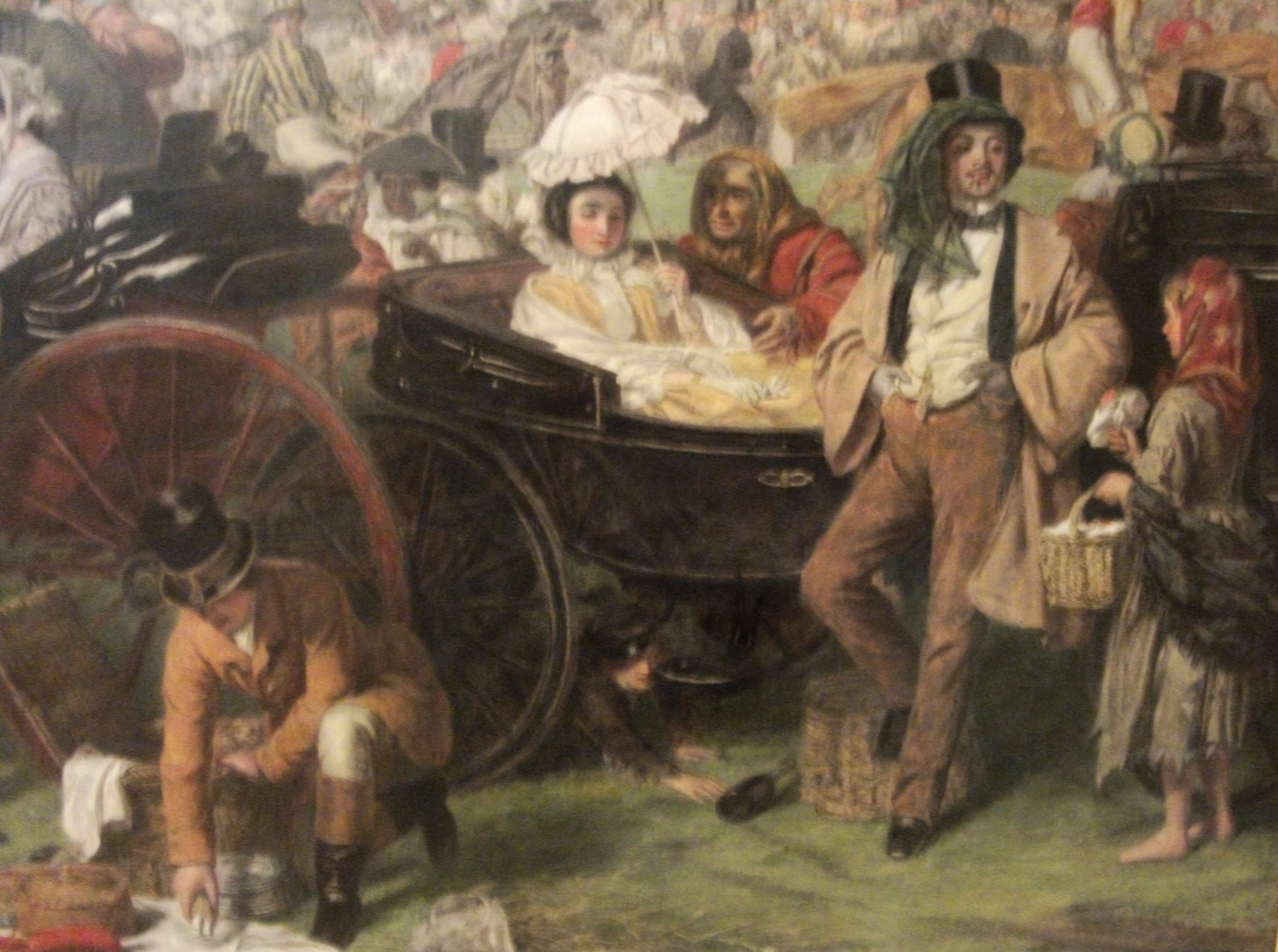
Detail from the Manchester version (lower right corner)

The Royal Academician John Evan Hodgson noted:

The races on Epsom Downs, the great Saturnalia of British sport, bring to the surface all that is most characteristic of London life. In this picture we can discern its elements, its luxury, its wealth, its beauty and refinement, its hopeless misery.

Research by Dr Mary Cowling indicates that Frith depicted individuals from nearly one hundred distinct social types from the finely graduated class system in Victorian England, each distinguished by its particular clothing and physical appearance. Frith believed in physiognomy, so each individual bears the features thought to be typical of his or her social position and character.

== Background ==
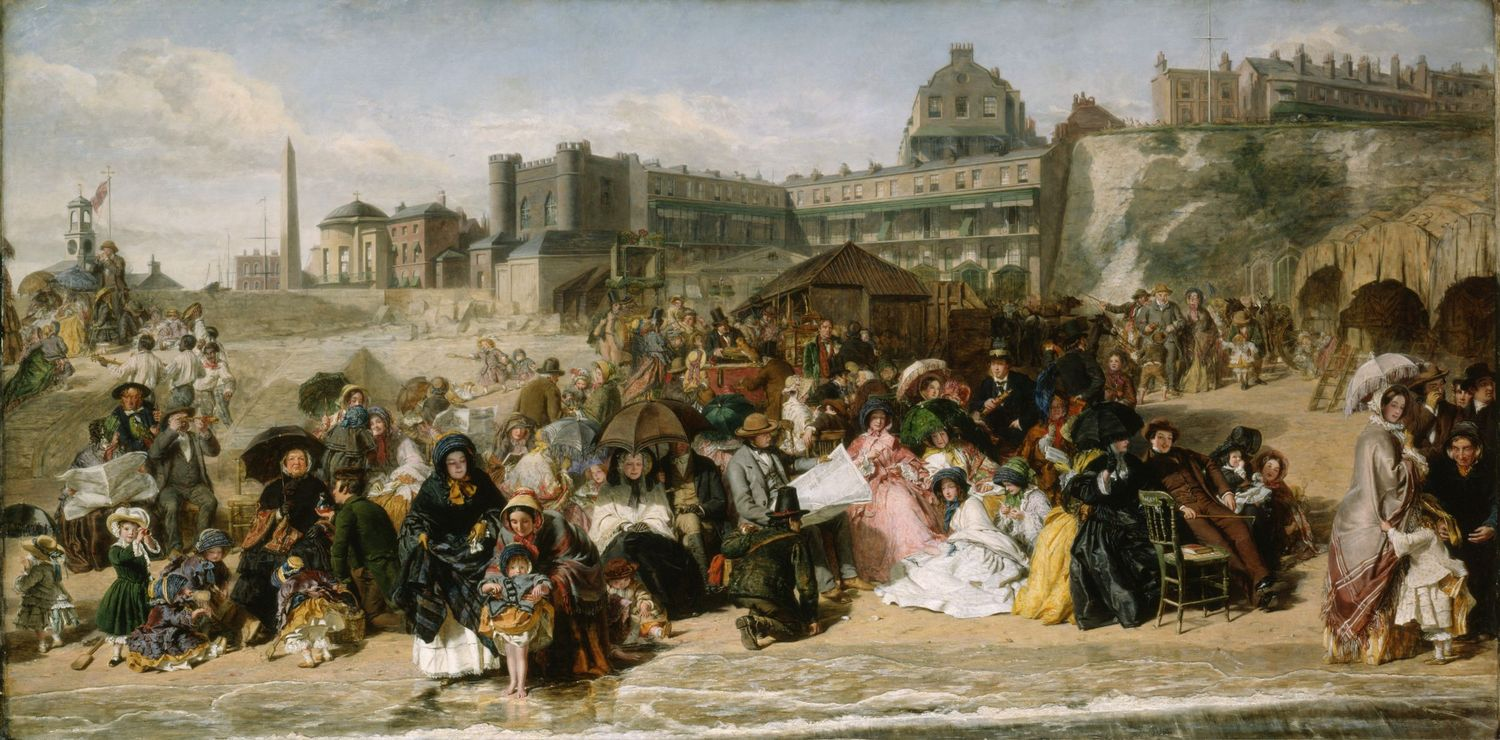
Life at the Seaside (also known as Ramsgate Sands)

After the success of his earlier work, Life at the Seaside (also known as Ramsgate Sands), Frith was keen to find another contemporary piece. He visited Epsom in May 1856 with Augustus Leopold Egg and made an initial sketch. Frith was commissioned to paint a five- or six-foot canvas by the chemist Jacob Bell, for a fee of £1,500. He also sold the right to sell copies of the painting, and one of his studies, to art dealer Ernest Gambart for another £1,500. The work took nearly two years to complete, with different arrangements tried out on two large sketches and a further visit to the racecourse before the large work was completed.

Frith used many live models for the painted figures, but also drew inspiration from photographs of Epsom racecourse and of groups of people. He hired an acrobat and his son from a pantomime in Drury Lane, and a jockey named Bundy, and commissioned Robert Howlett to take photographs of unusual groups of people. The 1896 edition of the boys' annual Chums includes an anecdote (page 117) about the boy acrobat who sat as a model for Frith: "This youth had a kind of idea that sitting meant turning head over heels; and every now and then Mr. Frith had to stop him from actually turning a somersault among his casts and drapery." The Chums article also relates how the young boy was impressed with the lavatory in Frith's house, exclaiming to his father: "Oh, father, such a beautiful place – all mahoginy (sic) and a chany (sic) basin to wash in."

== Reception ==
The painting was first exhibited at the Royal Academy exhibition in 1858, where it became so popular that a rail was needed to protect it from the thronging crowds (only the second time that a rail was installed at the Royal Academy exhibition: the first was in 1822 for David Wilkie's Chelsea Pensioners reading the Waterloo Dispatch). The painting was bequeathed to the National Gallery by Jacob Bell in 1859 and but later transferred to the Tate Gallery. Frith was commissioned to paint a second version for James Gresham of Stretford in 1893–94, which has been held by Manchester Art Gallery since 1896.

== References and sources ==
Sources

- Tate Gallery
- Illustrated Companion, Tate Gallery
- Manchester Art Gallery
- Re-discovered William Powell Frith sells at auction, BBC News, 16 December 2011
- The Royal Academy review: A guide to the exhibition of the Royal Academy of Arts, 1858, pp. 12–15.
- Victorian figurative painting: domestic life and the contemporary social scene, Mary Cowling, Papadakis Publisher, 2000, ISBN 1-901092-32-1, pp. 108–136.
- A thousand words, The Guardian, 11 June 2011
- William Powell Frith: painting the Victorian age; Mark Bills, Vivien Knight; Guildhall Art Gallery, Mercer Art Gallery; Yale University Press, 2006; ISBN 0-300-12190-3; p. 59.
