= Immune-mediated inflammatory diseases =

Conditions characterized by inflammation

An immune-mediated inflammatory disease (IMID) is any of a group of conditions or diseases that lack a definitive etiology, but which are characterized by common inflammatory pathways leading to inflammation, and which may result from, or be triggered by, a dysregulation of the normal immune response.

== Mechanism ==
IMIDs are caused by massive production of inflammatory cytokines. This is believed to be the result of an abnormal immune response.

== Risk factors ==
IMIDs occur in genetically predisposed individuals, due to various environmental and host factors. Some reviews include psychosomatic factors.

== Diseases considered as IMID ==
Diseases considered as IMID include

- asthma
- axial spondyloarthritis
- Crohn's disease (CD)
- diabetes type 1
- inflammatory bowel diseases (IBD)
- multiple sclerosis
- primary biliary cholangitis
- psoriasis
- psoriatic arthritis
- rheumatoid arthritis (RA)
- systemic lupus
- ulcerative colitis (UC).

== Common symptoms ==
Fatigue is a very common symptom in IMIDs. Fatigue often changes markedly within days and from day to day.

IMIDs negatively effect organs and systems (including peripheral and central nervous systems) which may cause chronic fatigue, pain, skin manifestations, multiorgan dysfunction and sleep disturbance effects. Some IMIDs cause hyperalgesia (abnormal sensitivity to pain).

== Treatment and outlook ==
Meds, including biologics, help some IMID patients, although resistance may develop in time. Other IMID patients are unresponsive or intolerant to current meds.

Stem cell therapy and CAR-T therapy are being researched for IMID.

Patients with IMIDs have increased risk of cardiovascular disease.

== Epidemiology ==
IMIDs have been estimated to affect 3-7% of the population.

A 2019 study found a split of incidence of new IMID cases of 6 IMID diseases as follows; asthma 55%, eczema 36%, psoriasis 7%, rheumatoid arthritis 2%, inflammatory bowel disease 0.7%, multiple sclerosis 0.1%.

== Inflammation ==
Inflammation is an important and growing area of biomedical research and health care because inflammation mediates and is the primary driver of many medical disorders and autoimmune diseases, including ankylosing spondylitis, psoriasis, psoriatic arthritis, Behçet's disease, rheumatoid arthritis, inflammatory bowel disease (IBD), and allergy, as well as many cardiovascular, neuromuscular, and infectious diseases. Some current research even suggests that aging is a consequence, in part, of inflammatory processes.

== See also ==
- Immune mediated polygenic arthritis
