= North Country Beagle =

Breed of dog that existed in Britain probably until early in the 19th century

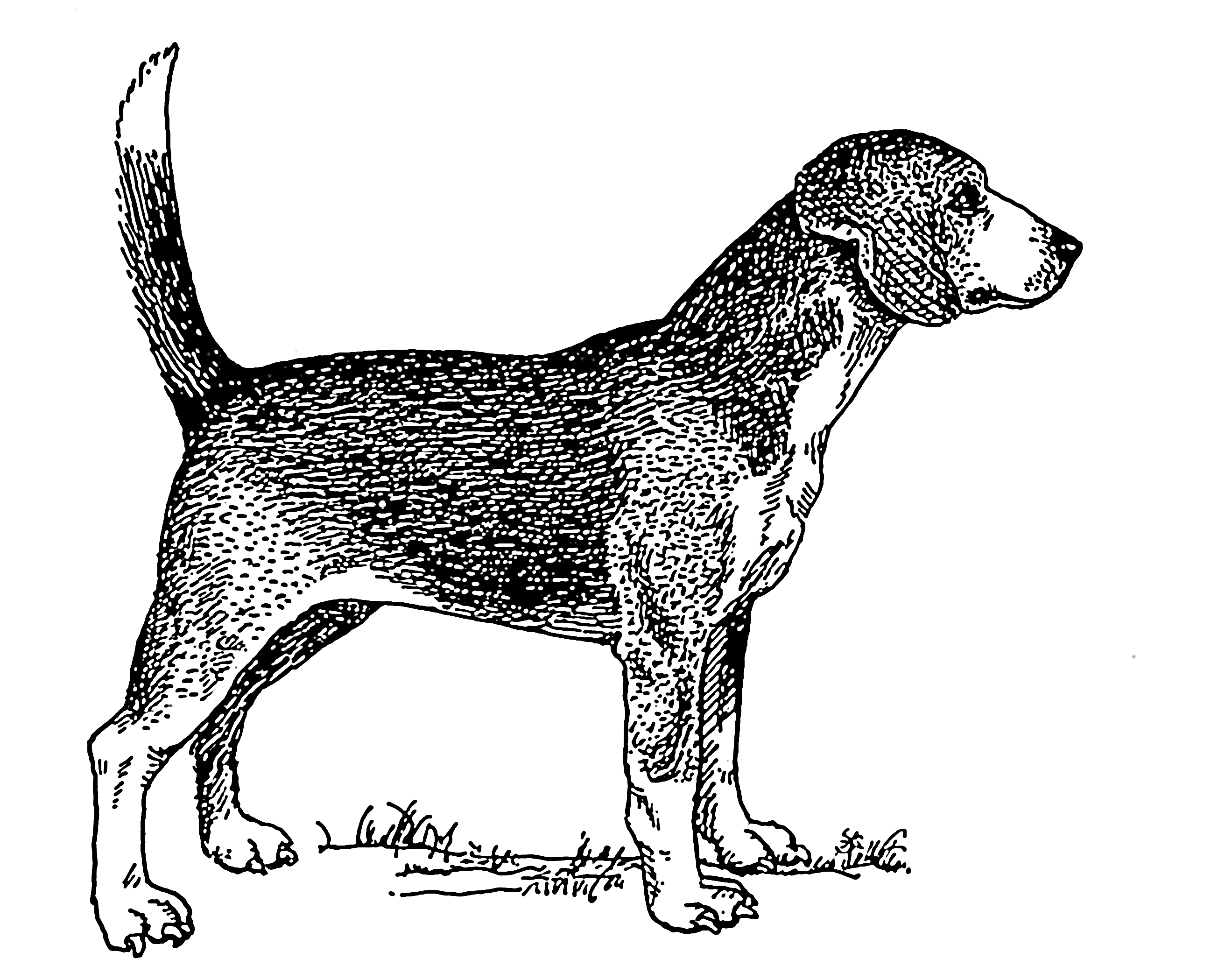
- Origin: Great Britain
- Breed status: Extinct

The North Country Beagle, Northern Hound or Northern Beagle was a breed of dog that existed in Britain probably until early in the 19th century. The exact date of its extinction is not known; it is likely that it was gradually interbred with other breeds, particularly the modern Beagle, until the genuine North Country Beagle bloodline ceased to exist.

The origins of the North Country Beagle are equally unclear. Most writers suggest that it was developed from the Talbot, whose origins are also uncertain, but which some have claimed originated in Normandy. The Talbot was a predominantly white, slow, deep-throated scent hound. At some point the Talbots were crossed with Greyhounds to give them an extra turn of speed, but they remained comparatively slow dogs that relied more on their nose than speed in the chase.

The North Country Beagle was a large, bony hound with a square head and long trailing ears. Chiefly bred in Yorkshire, it was common in the north of England, but below the River Trent the similar Southern Hound was more abundant. The North Country Beagle was a faster dog; in The British Encyclopedia of 1809, William Nicholson says that the North Country Beagle was kept by the "dashing class of sportsman" because it could "run down a brace [of hare] before dinner", but although a good scent hound, was probably lacking in this ability when compared to the delicate nose of the Southern Hound. The writer and poet Gervase Markham, who wrote a number of books on animal husbandry in the early 17th century described the North Country Beagle as having:

...a head more slender, with a longer nose, ears and flews more shallow, back broad, belly gaunt, joints long, tail small, and his general form more slender and greyhound-like...

In his The Dog, in Health and Disease in 1859, "Stonehenge" (the pen name of John Henry Walsh, later editor of The Field) says the two breeds could be differentiated by the large dewlap possessed by the Southern Hound. The Southern Hound seems to have also had a deeper more melodious voice; Markham says the North Country Beagle had "only a little shrill sweetness" and lacked depth of tone. How far the Talbot, Northern Hound and Southern Hound were intermixed by the 19th century is impossible to ascertain: while acknowledging that they had once existed as separate breeds, Stonehenge had never seen pure-bred varieties and classified the three breeds together.

Both the North Country Beagle and Southern Hound seem to have fallen out of favour during the 18th century as the fashion for less time-consuming hunts led to the development of the faster Foxhound. The North Country Beagle may have formed part of the packs kept by southern farmers for rabbit-hunting that would eventually become the nucleus for the modern Beagle breed. Stonehenge says that packs of hounds that resembled the description of the North Country Beagle still existed in Wales, Devon, Yorkshire and Sussex during the 19th century, but he was doubtful as to how far any of these packs truly represented any of the three early hound breeds.

Aside from the Beagle other modern hound breeds are believed to have North Country Beagle blood: Harriers and Foxhounds among others. Coonhounds and Bloodhounds are likely to have had more influence from the Southern Hound and Talbot lines, as they are excellent trackers but not as swift as other hound breeds.
