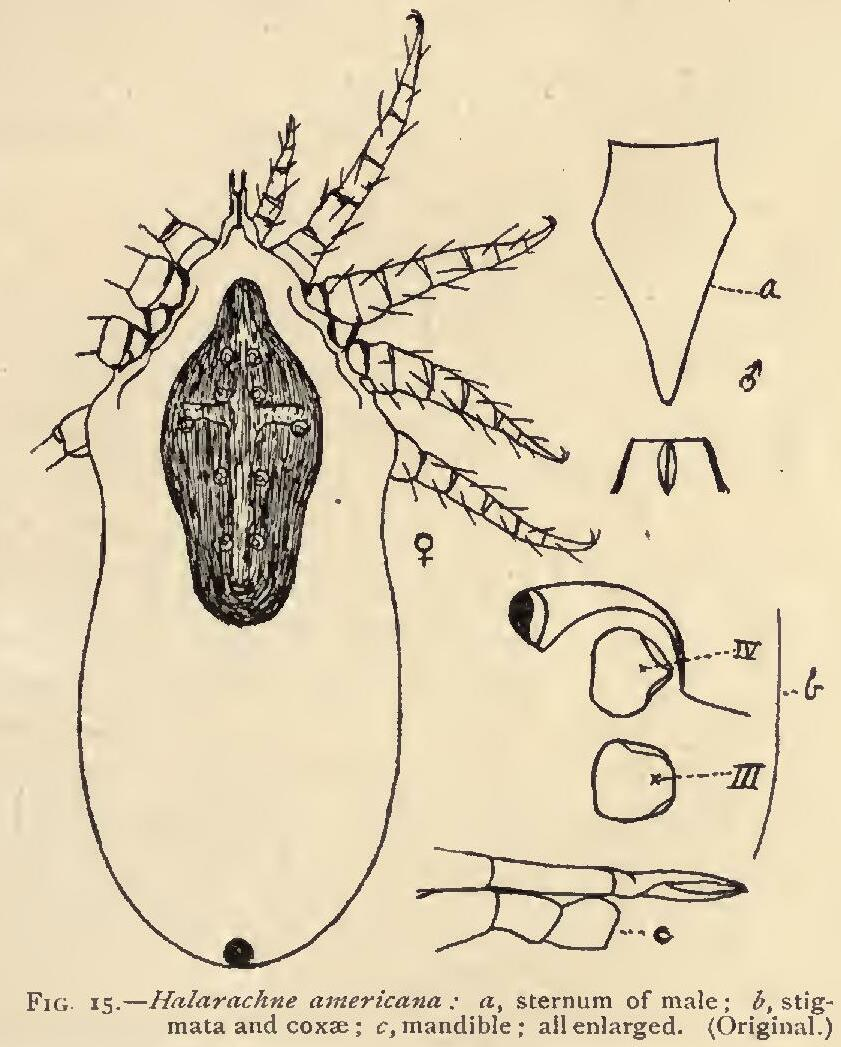

Conservation status
- Extinct (1952)

Scientific classification
- Kingdom: Animalia
- Phylum: Arthropoda
- Subphylum: Chelicerata
- Class: Arachnida
- Order: Mesostigmata
- Family: Halarachnidae
- Genus: Halarachne
- Species: †H. americana

Binomial name
- †Halarachne americana Banks, 1899

= Halarachne americana =

Species of mite

Halarachne americana, the Caribbean monk seal nasal mite, is an extinct species of mite. An obligate parasite, it depended on the nasal cavity of the Caribbean monk seal (Neomonachus tropicalis). Following the presumed extinction of the seal in 1952, the mite was unable to adapt and subsequently went extinct, an example of coextinction.
