= Southern Hound =

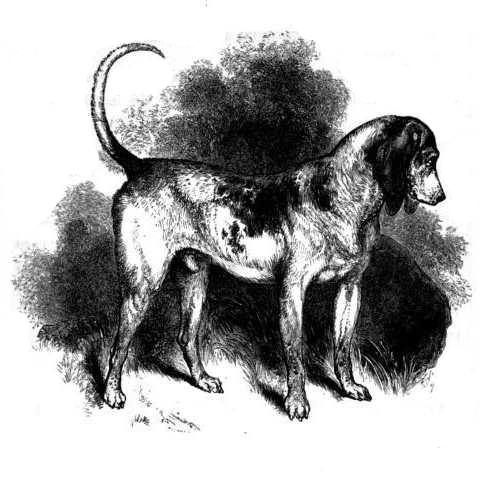
- Southern Hound (illustration from The Dog 1852)
- Origin: Britain
- Breed status: Extinct

The Southern Hound was a breed of dog that existed in Britain probably until sometime in the 19th century, now extinct. The exact date of its extinction is not known; it is likely that it was gradually interbred with other breeds until the genuine Southern Hound bloodline ceased to exist.

== Origins ==
The origins of the Southern Hound are equally unclear. Most writers suggest that it is derived from the Talbot, which was a predominantly white, slow, deep-throated, scent hound, also of uncertain origin, though it is sometimes claimed that it came from Normandy. It is suggested that at some point the Talbot was crossed with Greyhounds to give them an extra turn of speed. However, in The Dog published in 1852, William Youatt states that the Southern Hound may have existed in Britain since ancient times rather than being brought from France by the Normans.

== Description ==
The Southern Hound was a tall, heavy dog with a square head, and long ears. It had a deep chest, a long bony body and a deep melodious voice. It was a slow dog, but with excellent scenting abilities and was employed to follow the trail of the quarry during a hunt. Because of its lack of speed and deliberate nature, it was considered best used for hunting game such as hare or deer, which would eventually be exhausted by its relentless pursuit and, unlike a fox or rabbit, could not escape to the safety of a den or burrow.

== Popularity and decline ==
It was still common south of the River Trent in the 18th century. Further north the North Country Beagle or Northern Hound was favoured. This was a faster dog but probably lacked the delicate nose of the Southern Hound. In his The Dog, in Health and Disease in 1859, "Stonehenge" (the pen name of John Henry Walsh, editor of The Field) magazine says the two breeds could be differentiated by the large dewlap present in the Southern Hound, but the illustration of the Southern Hound in the same book lacks this detail. How far the Talbot, Northern Hound and Southern Hound were intermixed is impossible to ascertain: authors writing in the mid-19th century were already having difficulty distinguishing between the three breeds.

The Southern Hound seems to have fallen out of favour during the 18th century as the fashion for shorter hunts led to the development of the faster Foxhound. Youatt wrote that there were still packs in use in Devon in the 19th century and that the Southern Hound was sometimes used in conjunction with Foxhound packs to help pick up the cold trail when the pack lost the scent. Some were employed in Wales on polecat hunts (that could last several days), and they appear to have been used to hunt otter before being employed as breeding stock for the development of the Otterhound.

== Genetic legacy ==
The famous bloodhound breeder Edwin Brough reported that in 1881 he used a pure bred Southern Hound, "Clara", like the one pictured in this article as a cross to his bloodhounds, and this outcross was bred on into the modern population of bloodhounds.

Many of the modern hound breeds are believed to have Southern Hound blood: Beagles, Harriers, Foxhounds, Coonhounds and Bloodhounds among others.
