= Airedale Beagles =

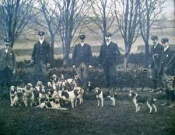
- Dawson Jowett and Tom Clark with the pack, 1891
- Hunt type: Beagling
- Country: England

History
- Founded: 1891
- Parent pack: Bradford Harriers
- Historical quarry: Hare

Hunt information
- Hound breed: Beagle
- Hunt country: West Yorkshire &North Yorkshire, bordering Lancashire
- Master(s): M Spilsbury & P A Osbaldiston
- Quarry: Rabbit
- Kennelled: Silsden
- Website: www.airedalebeagles.com

The Airedale Beagles was a beagle pack founded in 1891.

== History ==
The pack was founded in 1891 following a chance meeting between Dawson Jowett and Tom Clark, the former becoming the huntsman and the latter the kennelman. The pair are believed to have made use of hounds from the Bradford Harriers which was disbanded several years earlier.

The pack was trencher fed until 1922 when kennels and a huntsman’s house was built in Eldwick, the pack is now kennelled in Silsden.

Since the passing of the Hunting Act of 2004, the pack hunts scent trails and rabbits and is very occasionally called to locate hares that have been injured following a shoot, all of which is permitted under the legislation.

The hunt folded in 2023.

== Hunt country ==
The country hunted is in West Yorkshire and North Yorkshire, bordering Lancashire, from Trawden in the south-west, to Horton in Ribblesdale in the north and Otley in the east, including Rombalds Moor, the terrain is fell and rough pasture with high stone walls.

== See also ==
- Beagling
