= Hound (heraldry) =

Heraldic charge

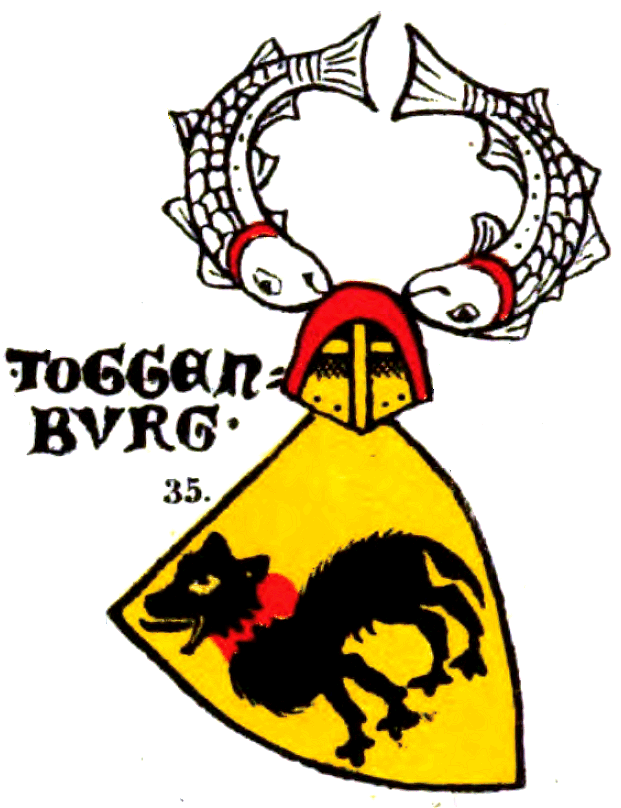
Coat of arms of the counts of Toggenburg in the Zürich armorial (c. 1340)

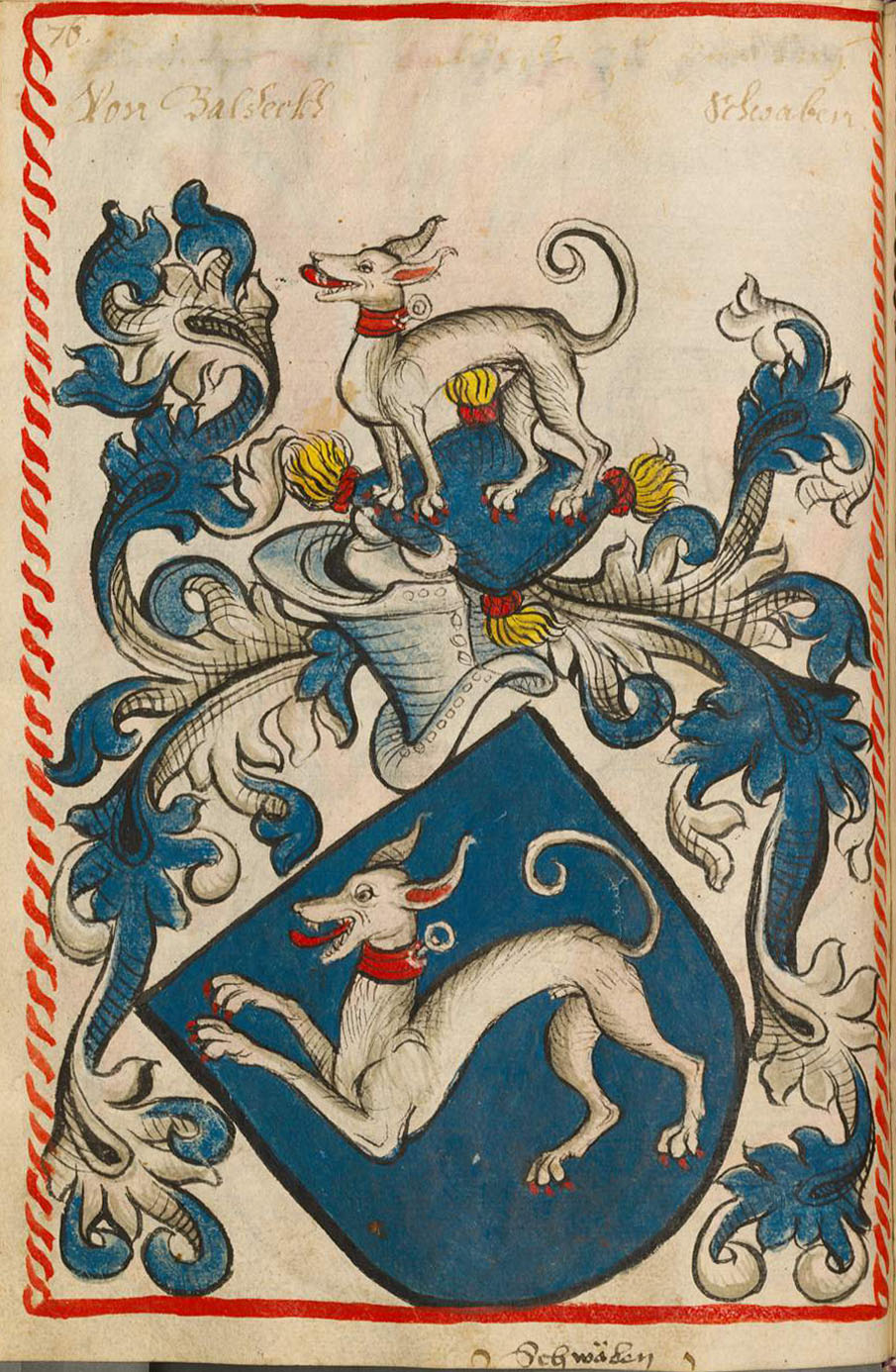
Coat of arms of Baldeck (a baronial family of Württemberg) in Scheiblersches Wappenbuch (15th century)

The hound is a charge in classical heraldry. In English heraldry, the commonly used variant are the talbot, also blazoned as sleuth-hound, e.g. in the arms of Wolseley of Staffordshire, the greyhound and bloodhound. Rarely seen variants are the ratch-hound, the mastiff (alant or aland), the foxhound, the spaniel and the terrier. The "sea-dog" is a curious charge resembling the talbot but with scales, webbed feet and a broad tail, used in the arms of Stourton barony, presumably originally depicting a beaver (as used in the Coat of arms of Oxford). Similar charges include the wolf and the fox.

German heraldry distinguishes three variants of dogs: Windhund (greyhound), Bracke and Rüde (also Dogge).

Attitudes of the hound may be sejant, rampant, salient (its hind feet on the ground), passant (trippant), skipping, courant (sometimes blazoned "in full chase" or "in full course") or questing (i.e. pointing). The ears, tongue and claws may be in different tinctures. It is often shown gorged or collared.

An early example of a blazon involving a dog (levrier) is that of Sir Perez Burdeux in Walford's Roll (Harley MS. 6589, c. 1275): porte d'or ou ung lev'er de gules, ou le collere de sable ou le bordure de sable besante dor (i.e.: or a hound gules collared sable, a border sable besanty or).

== See also ==
- Cultural depictions of the dog
- Talbot (dog)
- Calygreyhound
- White Greyhound of Richmond
