= Reverse sneezing =

Clinical event in dogs and cats

A pug experiencing reverse sneezing

Reverse sneezing, also known as inspiratory paroxysmal respiration, is a clinical event that occurs in dogs and cats. It is possibly caused by a muscle spasm at the back of the animal's mouth, more specifically where the muscle and throat meet. Other hypotheses state that it occurs when the animal's soft palate gets irritated. The irritation causes spasms in the soft palate muscle, thus narrowing the trachea. Because the trachea is narrowed, the pet is unable to inhale a full breath of air, resulting in forceful attempts to inhale through the nose. This causes the pet to experience reverse sneezing.

The clinical symptoms seem to occur more in brachycephalic dog breeds such as Pugs, Brussels Griffons, Boxer, English- and French bulldogs. The specific cause of reverse sneezing is unknown but there could be a link between nasal, pharyngeal, or sinus irritation which increases the production of mucus. In attempt to remove this excess mucus, reverse sneezing can be observed. Another hypothesis is based on the overexcitement of the pet, which might cause reverse sneezing. Reverse sneezing might also be caused by a previous diagnosis such as tracheal collapse. It can also be a sign of an asthma attack in pets.

During an episode of reverse sneezing, symptoms such as sudden, involuntary respiratory reflex can be noted. As a response to reverse sneezing, the air is sucked in through the nose in a series of rapid and forceful inhalations. An episode of reverse sneezing usually lasts for 30 seconds or less, although it might feel longer for the owner. For reverse sneezing, there are no confirmed treatments yet to be found, but there are some commonly used remedies. It is recommended to have a veterinarian examine a pet regardless of severity.

== Signs and symptoms ==
Reverse sneezing oftentimes occurs when the pet is asleep or immediately after a long nap. It can also be experienced following play, exercise, or meals. Other pets experience it whilst inhaling dust but the episodes of reverse sneezing typically occur randomly. The pet's size does not have a direct impact on reverse sneezing. However, smaller breeds have shown to be more susceptible to reverse sneezing. In addition, research shows that brachycephalic dogs and cats are more prone to develop reverse sneezing than other dog or cat breeds.

Reverse sneezing is characterized by rapid and long inhalations, extending from the head and neck. In most cases, the pet stands still during an episode. A snorting or gagging sound can be observed as a result of a pet inhaling their sneezes.

The pet undergoes reverse sneezing to expel an irritating agent. Normally, a regular sneeze helps by expelling the irritating agent in the nasal cavity. Coughing will make the irritating agent move further down in the trachea. Reverse sneezing is a way of the pet's body to expel an irritating agent slightly further down at the nasopharynx or the area near the soft palate. Some examples of possible causes of irritation that result in reverse sneezing include: allergies, nasal mites, exercise intolerance and elongated soft palate. An elongated soft palate mostly occurs in dogs or cats of brachycephalic breeds.

A pet that experiences reverse sneezing appears to be normal after an episode. Most pets who are prone to developing the condition will experience reverse sneezing repeatedly throughout their lives. The reverse sneezing might be distressing for the animal but it is not known to be harmful.

=== Reverse sneezing as a symptom of other conditions ===
It is common for reverse sneezing to be a symptom of another condition or diagnosis, so that it might lead to the discovery of an underlying condition. A pet which was diagnosed with nasal eucoleosis was experiencing symptoms of reverse sneezing amongst other clinical symptoms. Reverse sneezing can also be a sign of infestation with Pneumonyssoides caninum, a species of mite parasitic in the nasal passages of dogs.

== Treatment ==
The treatment of reverse sneezing does not specifically require medication. Studies have proven that medication such as antihistamines and steroids may be effective if the reverse sneezing is serious, chronic or allergy-related. In case of chronic episodes or other respiratory issues, a clinical diagnosis made by a veterinarian is recommended. In severe cases of reverse sneezing, rhinoscopy can be used to determine possible causes for the reverse sneezing.

== Prognosis ==
Although a great deal of research has been done in order to determine the clinical cause of reverse sneezing, any specific origin for reverse sneezing has not yet been found.
