= Beagle =

Breed of small scent hound

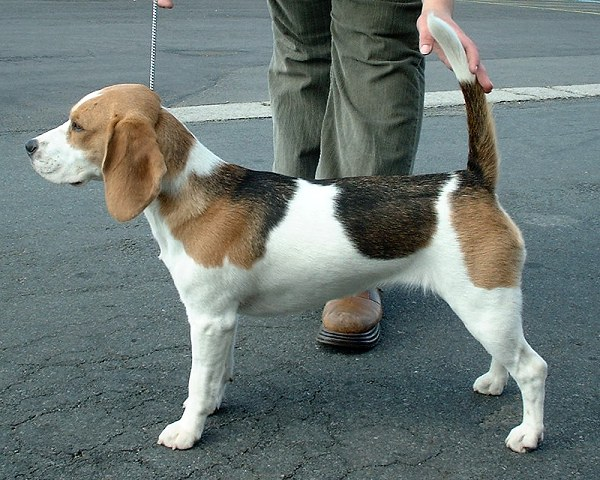
- Tricolour Beagle
- Other names: English Beagle
- Origin: England
Traits
- Height: 13–16 in (33–41 cm)
Weight	Males	22–25 lb (10.0–11.3 kg)
	Females	20–23 lb (9.1–10.4 kg)
- Coat: Short haired, hard coat of medium length
- Colour: Tricolour or white in combination with black & tan/brown or brown/tan or yellow/white
Kennel club standards
- The Kennel Club: standard
- Fédération Cynologique Internationale: standard

The Beagle is a British breed of scent hound, similar in appearance to the much larger foxhound. It was bred primarily for hunting rabbit or hare, known as beagling. Its sense of smell and tracking instincts make it suitable for use as a detection dog for prohibited agricultural imports and foodstuffs in quarantine. It is commonly kept as a companion dog.

The modern breed was developed in Great Britain around the 1830s from several breeds, including the Talbot Hound, the North Country Beagle, the Southern Hound, and possibly the Harrier.

== History ==
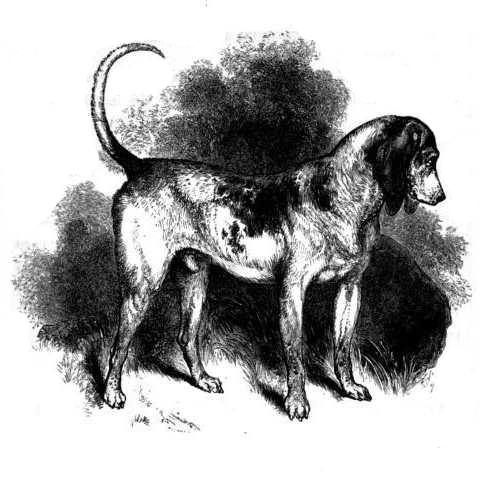
The Southern Hound is thought to be an ancestor of the Beagle

The origin of the Beagle is uncertain. In the 11th century, William the Conqueror brought the St. Hubert Hound and the Talbot hound to Britain. In Britain, both of these strains were then crossed with Greyhounds to give them speed and stamina for deer hunting. Beagles are similar to the Harrier and the extinct Southern Hound, though they are smaller and slower.

From the Middle Ages, Beagle was used as a generic description for the smaller hounds, though these dogs differed considerably from the modern breed. Miniature breeds of Beagle-type dogs were known from the times of Edward II and Henry VII, who both had packs of Glove Beagles, so named since they were small enough to fit on a glove, and Queen Elizabeth I kept a breed known as a Pocket Beagle, which stood 8 to 9 inches (20 to 23 cm) at the shoulder. Small enough to fit in a "pocket" or saddlebag, they rode along on the hunt. The larger hounds would run the prey to ground, then the hunters would release the small dogs to continue the chase through underbrush. Elizabeth I referred to the dogs as her singing Beagles and often entertained guests at her royal table by letting her Pocket Beagles cavort amid their plates and cups. 19th-century sources refer to these breeds interchangeably and it is possible that the two names refer to the same small variety. In George Jesse's Researches into the History of the British Dog from 1866, the early 17th-century poet and writer Gervase Markham is quoted referring to the beagle as small enough to sit on a man's hand and to the:

little small mitten-beagle, which may be companion for a ladies kirtle, and in the field will run as cunningly as any hound whatere, only their musick is very small like reeds.

By the 18th century, two breeds had been developed for hunting hare and rabbit: the Southern Hound and the North Country Beagle (or Northern Hound). The Southern Hound, a tall, heavy dog with a square head, and long, soft ears, was common from south of the River Trent and probably closely related to the Talbot Hound. Though slow, it had stamina and an excellent scenting ability. The North Country Beagle was bred chiefly in Yorkshire and was common in the northern counties. It was smaller than the Southern Hound, less heavy-set, and with a more pointed muzzle. It was faster than its southern counterpart but its scenting abilities were less well-developed.

Standards for the Pocket Beagle were drawn up as late as 1901; these genetic lines are now extinct, although modern breeders have attempted to recreate the variety.

=== Development of the modern breed ===
Reverend Phillip Honeywood established a Beagle pack in Essex in the 1830s; it is believed that this pack formed the basis for the modern breed. Although details of the pack's lineage are not recorded, it is thought that North Country Beagles and Southern Hounds were strongly represented; William Youatt suspected that Harriers formed a good majority of the Beagle's bloodline, but the origin of the Harrier is itself obscure. Honeywood's Beagles were small, standing at about 10 inches (25 cm) at the shoulder, and pure white according to John Mills (writing in The Sportsman's Library in 1845). Prince Albert and Lord Winterton also had Beagle packs around this time, and royal favour no doubt led to some revival of interest in the breed, but Honeywood's pack was regarded as the finest of the three.

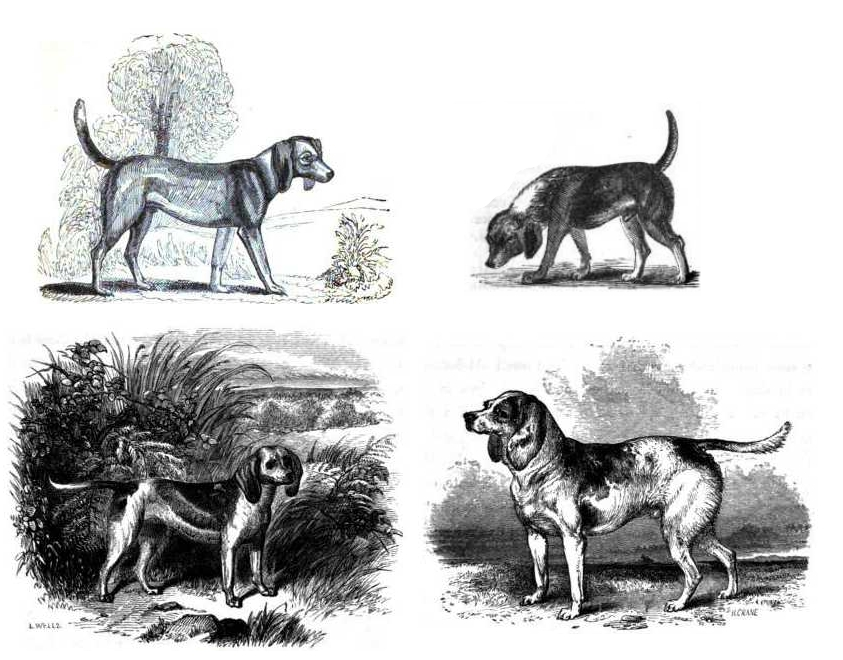
Early images of the Beagle (clockwise from top left): 1833, 1835, Stonehenge's Medium (1859, reusing Youatt's 1852 "Beagle" image) and Dwarf Beagle (1859).

Although credited with the development of the modern breed, Honeywood concentrated on producing dogs for hunting and it was left to Thomas Johnson to refine the breeding to produce dogs that were both attractive and capable hunters. Two strains were developed: the rough-coated and smooth-coated varieties. The rough-coated beagle survived until the beginning of the 20th century, and there were even records of one making an appearance at a dog show as late as 1969, but this variety is now extinct, having probably been absorbed into the standard beagle bloodline.

In the 1840s, a standard Beagle type was beginning to develop. The distinction between the North Country Beagle and Southern Hound had been lost, but there was still a large variation in size, character, and reliability among the emerging packs. In 1856, "Stonehenge" (the pseudonym of John Henry Walsh), writing in the Manual of British Rural Sports, was still dividing beagles into four varieties: the medium Beagle; the dwarf or lapdog beagle; the fox beagle (a smaller, slower version of the Foxhound); and the rough-coated or terrier beagle, which he classified as a cross between any of the other varieties and one of the Scottish terrier breeds. Stonehenge also gives the start of a standard description:

In size the Beagle measures from 10 inches, or even less, to 15. In shape they resemble the old southern hound in miniature, but with more neatness and beauty; and they also resemble that hound in style of hunting.

By 1887, the threat of extinction was on the wane: there were 18 Beagle packs in England. The Beagle Club was formed in 1890 and the first standard drawn up at the same time. The following year the Association of Masters of Harriers and Beagles was formed. Both organisations aimed to further the best interests of the breed, and both were keen to produce a standard type of Beagle. By 1902, the number of packs had risen to 44.

=== Export ===
Beagles were in the United States by the 1840s at the latest, but the first dogs were imported strictly for hunting and were of variable quality. Since Honeywood had only started breeding in the 1830s, it is unlikely these dogs were representative of the modern breed, and the description of them as looking like straight-legged Dachshunds with weak heads has little resemblance to the standard. Serious attempts at establishing a quality bloodline began in the early 1870s when General Richard Rowett from Illinois imported some dogs from England and began breeding. Rowett's Beagles are believed to have formed the models for the first American standard, drawn up by Rowett, L. H. Twadell, and Norman Ellmore in 1887.

== Popularity ==
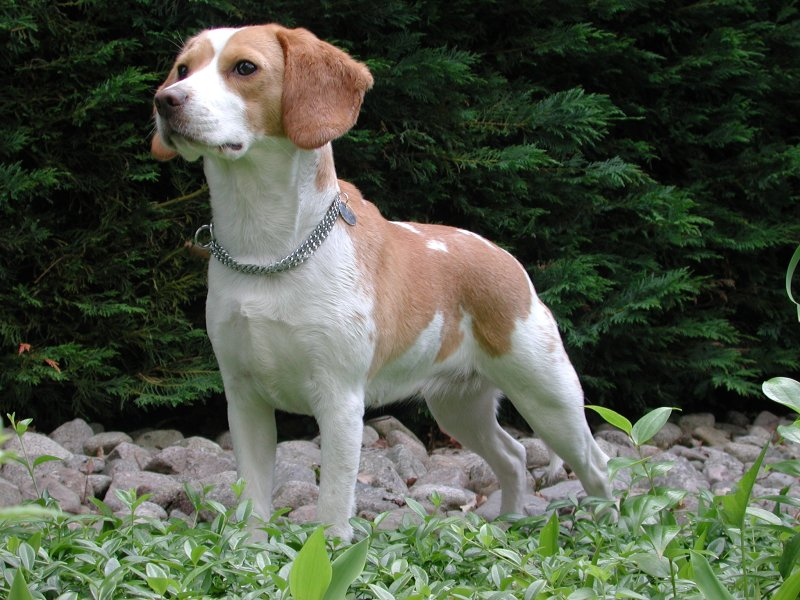
A uniform type for the breed developed at the start of the 20th century

On its formation, the Association of Masters of Harriers and Beagles took over the running of a regular show at Peterborough that had started in 1889, and the Beagle Club in the UK held its first show in 1896. The regular showing of the breed led to the development of a uniform type, and the Beagle continued to prove a success up until the outbreak of World War I when all shows were suspended. After the war, the breed was again struggling for survival in the UK: the last of the Pocket Beagles was probably lost during this time, and registrations fell to an all-time low. A few breeders (notably Reynalton Kennels) managed to revive interest in the dog and by World War II, the breed was once again doing well. Registrations dropped again after the end of the war but almost immediately recovered.

As purebred dogs, Beagles have always been more popular in the United States and Canada than in their native country England. The National Beagle Club of America was formed in 1888 and by 1901 a Beagle had won a Best in Show title. As in the UK, activity during World War I was minimal, but the breed showed a much stronger revival in the U.S. when hostilities ceased. In 1928 it won a number of prizes at the Westminster Kennel Club's show and by 1939 a Beagle – Champion Meadowlark Draughtsman – had captured the title of top-winning American-bred dog for the year. On 12 February 2008, a Beagle, K-Run's Park Me In First (Uno), won the Best In Show category at the Westminster Kennel Club show for the first time in the competition's history. In North America they have been consistently in the top-ten most-popular breeds for over 30 years. From 1953 to 1959 the beagle was ranked No. 1 on the list of the American Kennel Club's registered breeds; in 2005 and 2006 it ranked 5th out of the 155 breeds registered. In the UK they are not quite so popular, placing 28th and 30th in the rankings of registrations with the Kennel Club in 2005 and 2006 respectively. In the United States the beagle ranked 4th most popular breed in 2012 and 2013, behind the Labrador Retriever, German Shepherd, and Golden Retriever.

== Name ==
According to the Oxford English Dictionary, the first mention of beagle in English literature dates from c. 1475 in The Squire of Low Degree. The origin of the word beagle is uncertain, although it has been suggested that the word derives from the French begueule which means "gate throat".

It is not known why the black and tan Kerry Beagle, present in Ireland since Celtic times, has the beagle description, since at 22 to 24 inches (56 to 61 cm) it is significantly taller than the modern day Beagle, and in earlier times was even larger. Some writers suggest that the Beagle's scenting ability may have come from cross-breeding earlier strains with the Kerry Beagle. Originally used for hunting stags, it is today used for hare and drag hunting.

== Appearance ==
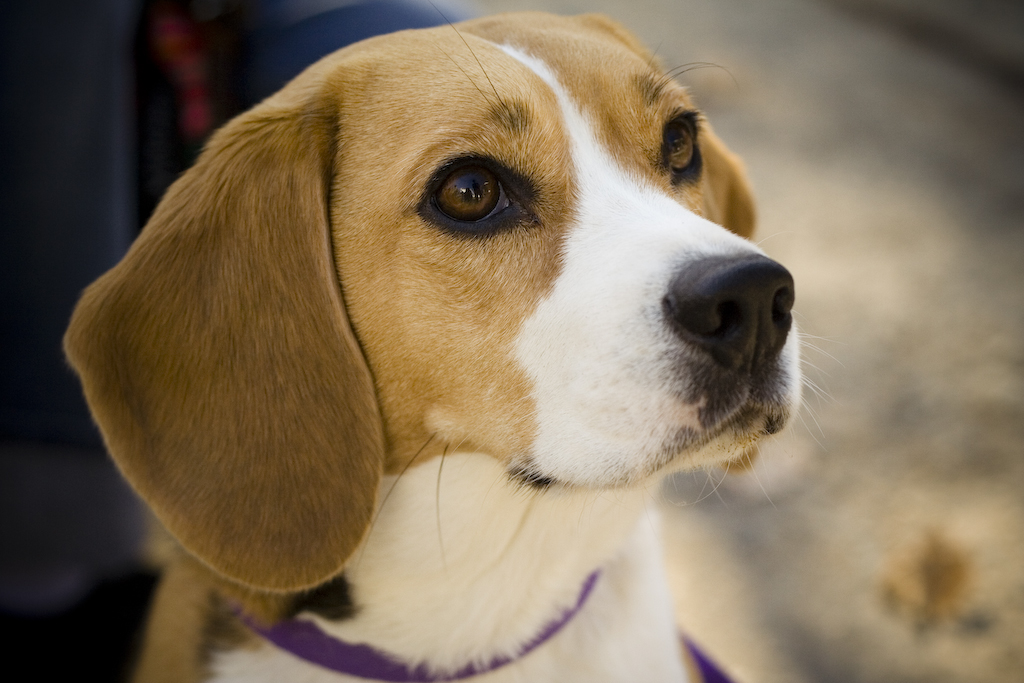
The Kennel Club (UK) standard states the Beagle should give the impression of quality without coarseness.

The general appearance of the Beagle resembles a miniature Foxhound, but the head is broader and the muzzle shorter, the expression completely different and the legs shorter in proportion to the body. They are generally between 33 and 40 centimetres (13 and 16 in) high at the withers and weigh between 18 and 35 lb (8.2 and 15.9 kg), with females being slightly smaller than males on average. They have a smooth, somewhat domed skull with a medium-length, square-cut muzzle, and a black (or occasionally liver) gumdrop nose. The jaw is strong, and the teeth scissor together with the upper teeth fitting perfectly over the lower teeth. Both sets align square to the jaw. The eyes are large, hazel or brown, with a mild, hound-like pleading look. The large ears are long, soft, and low-set, turning towards the cheeks slightly and rounded at the tips. Beagles have a strong, medium-length neck (which is long enough for them to easily bend to the ground to pick up a scent), with little folding in the skin but some evidence of a dewlap; a broad chest narrowing to a tapered abdomen and waist and a long, slightly curved tail (known as the "stern") tipped with white. The white tip, known as the flag, was bred for selectively, as the tail remains easily seen when the dog's head is down following a scent. The tail does not curl over the back, but is held upright when the dog is active. The Beagle has a muscular body and a medium-length, smooth, hard coat. The front legs are straight and carried under the body while the rear legs are muscular and well bent at the stifles.

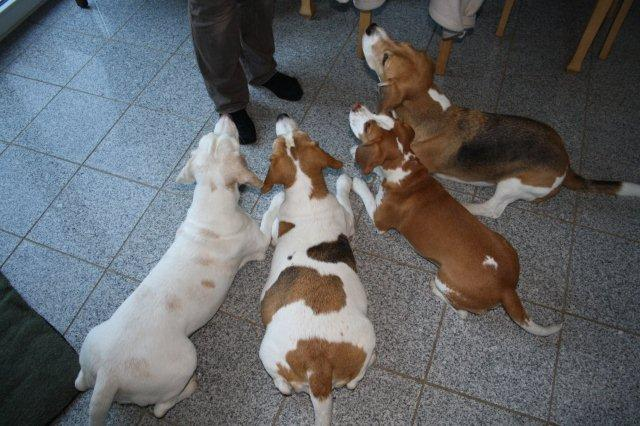
Beagle hound colours: Two-coloured "tan and white" (older female with fading colour), tricoloured broken, two-coloured "red and white", "tricoloured"

The tricoloured Beagle—white with large black areas and light brown shading—is the most common. Tricoloured Beagles occur in a number of shades, from the "Classic Tri" with a jet black saddle (also known as "Blackback"), to the "Dark Tri" (where faint brown markings are intermingled with more prominent black markings), to the "Faded Tri" (where faint black markings are intermingled with more prominent brown markings). Some tricoloured dogs have a broken pattern, sometimes referred to as pied. These dogs have mostly white coats with patches of black and brown hair. Tricolour Beagles are almost always born black and white. The white areas are typically set by eight weeks, but the black areas may fade to brown as the puppy matures. (The brown may take between one and two years to fully develop.) Some Beagles gradually change colour during their lives, and may lose their black markings entirely.

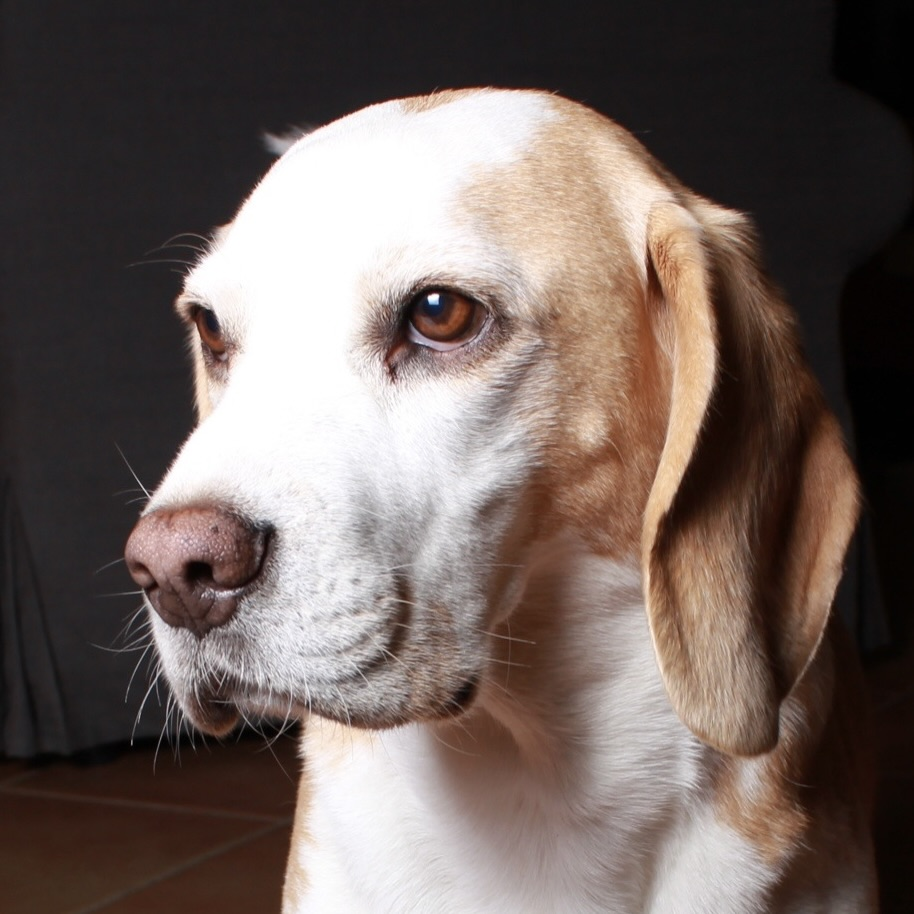
Lemon Beagle

Two-colour varieties always have a white base colour with areas of the second colour. Tan and white is the most common two-colour variety, but there is a wide range of other colours including lemon, a very light tan; red, a reddish, almost orange, brown; and liver, a darker brown, and black. Liver is not common and is not permitted in some standards; it tends to occur with yellow eyes. Ticked or mottled varieties may be either white or black with different coloured flecks (ticking), such as the blue-mottled or bluetick Beagle, which has spots that appear to be a midnight-blue colour, similar to the colouring of the Bluetick Coonhound. Some tricolour Beagles also have ticking of various colours in their white areas.

Saddle-patterned Beagles that express ancient domino (eA) are called hare-pied. Domino restricts eumelanin production leading to a smaller and faded saddle. Dark hairs in the area of the saddle have a light-coloured hair base. The nose pigment may be lightened down the middle.

== Sense of smell ==
Alongside the Bloodhound and Basset Hound, the Beagle has one of the best developed senses of smell of any dog. In the 1950s, John Paul Scott and John Fuller began a 13-year study of canine behaviour. As part of this research, they tested the scenting abilities of various breeds by putting a mouse in a one-acre field and timing how long it took the dogs to find it. The Beagles found it in less than a minute while Fox Terriers took 15 minutes and Scottish Terriers failed to find it at all. The long ears and large lips of the Beagle probably assist in trapping the scents close to the nose.

== Variations ==
=== Breed varieties ===
The American Kennel Club recognises two separate varieties of Beagle: the 13-inch for hounds less than 13 inches (33 cm), and the 15-inch for those between 13 and 15 inches (33 and 38 cm). The Canadian Kennel Club recognises a single type, with a height not exceeding 15 inches (38 cm). The Kennel Club (UK) and FCI affiliated clubs recognise a single type, with a height of between 13 and 16 inches (33 and 41 cm).

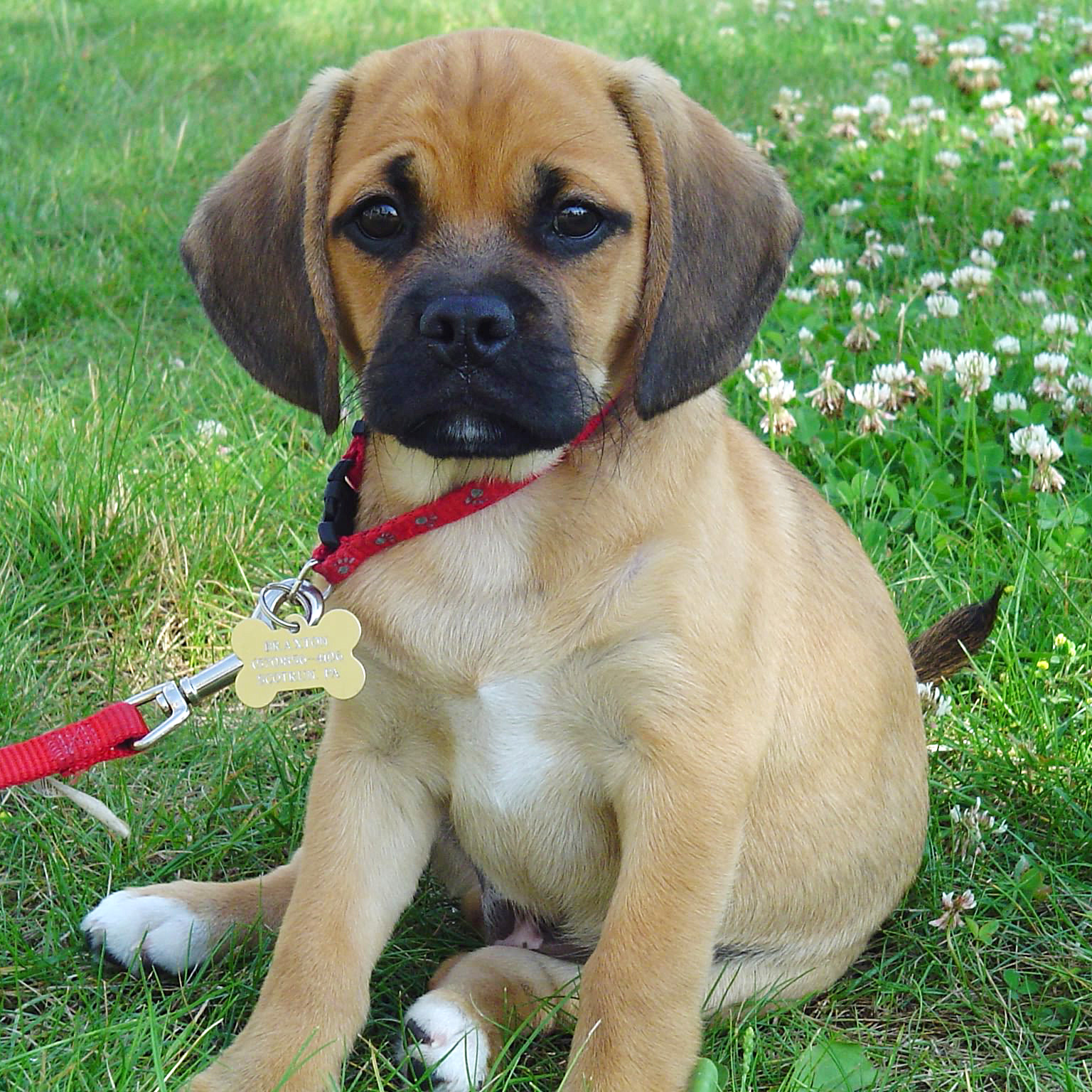
A Puggle, a Beagle/pug cross, shows traits from both breeds.

English and American varieties are sometimes mentioned. However, there is no official recognition from any Kennel Club for this distinction. Beagles fitting the American Kennel Club standard – which disallows animals over 15 inches (38 cm) – are smaller on average than those fitting the Kennel Club standard which allows heights up to 16 inches (41 cm).

Pocket Beagles are sometimes advertised for sale but while the UK Kennel Club originally specified a standard for the pocket Beagle in 1901, the variety is now not recognised by any Kennel Club.

A strain known as Patch Hounds was developed by Willet Randall and his family from 1896 specifically for their rabbit hunting ability. They trace their bloodline back to Field Champion Patch, but do not necessarily have a patchwork marking.

=== Crossbreeds ===
In the 1850s, John Henry Walsh (Stonehenge) recommended a cross between a Beagle and a Scottish Terrier as a retriever. He found the crossbreed to be a good worker, silent and obedient, but it had the drawback that it was small and could barely carry a hare. More recently, the trend has been for "designer dogs" and one of the most popular has been the Beagle/Pug cross known as a puggle. Some puppies of this cross are less excitable than a Beagle and with a lower exercise requirement, similar to the Pug parent; but many are highly excitable and require vigorous exercise.

== Temperament ==
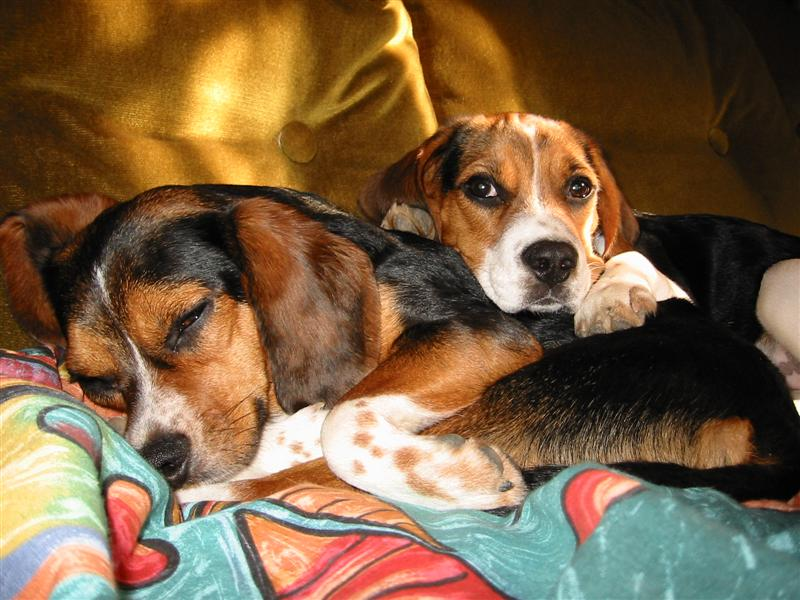
Beagles are happy to rest

The Beagle has an even temper and gentle disposition. Described in several breed standards as "merry", they are amiable and typically neither aggressive nor timid, although this depends on the individual. They enjoy company, and although they may initially be standoffish with strangers, they are easily won over. They make poor guard dogs for this reason, although their tendency to bark or howl when confronted with the unfamiliar makes them good watch dogs. In a 1985 study conducted by Ben and Lynette Hart, the Beagle was given the highest excitability rating, along with the Yorkshire Terrier, Cairn Terrier, Miniature Schnauzer, West Highland White Terrier, and Fox Terrier.^{[c]}

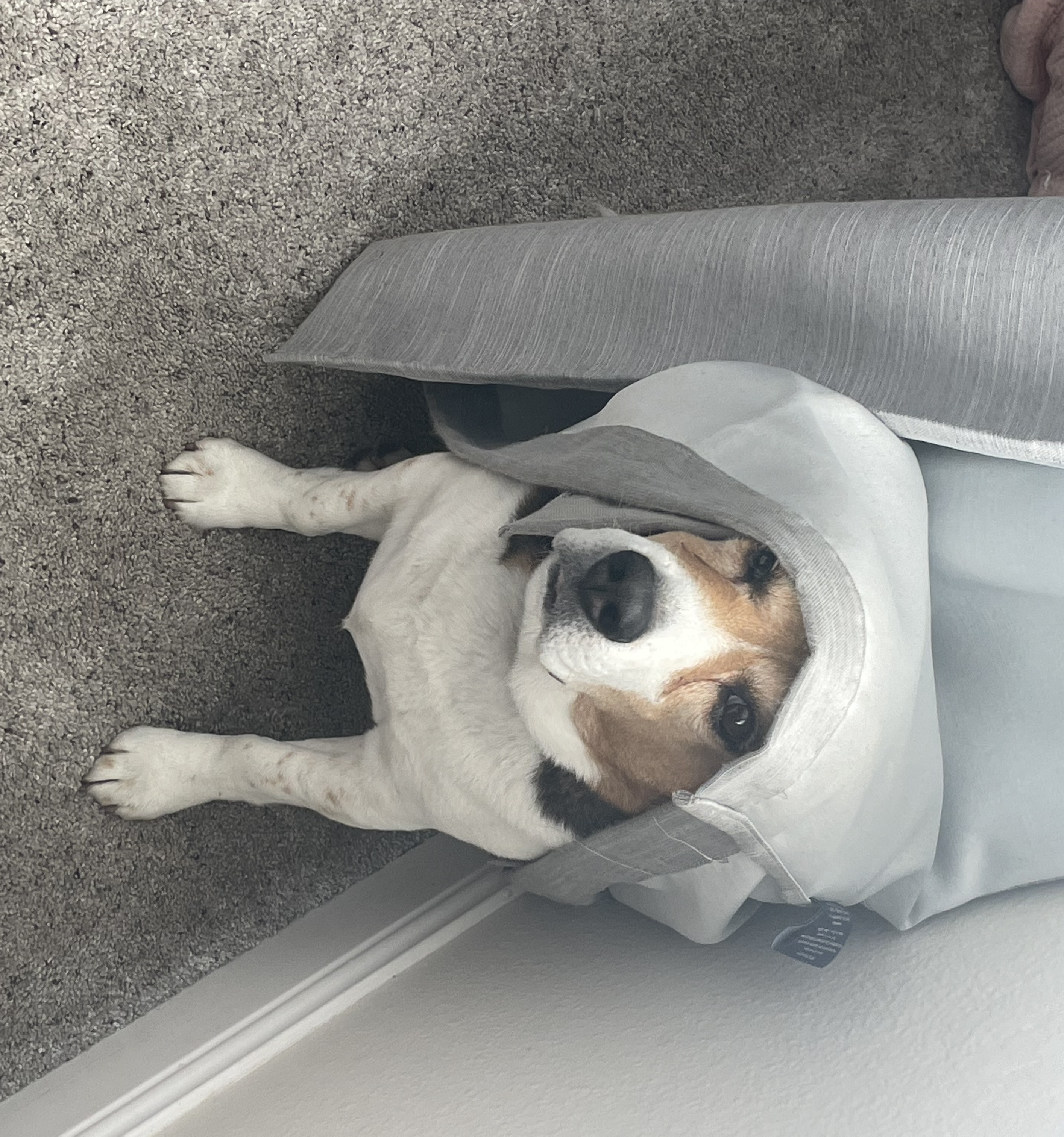
A Beagle hiding under a curtain

They are ranked 72nd in Stanley Coren's The Intelligence of Dogs, as Coren places them among the group with the lowest degree of working/obedience intelligence. Coren's scale, however, does not assess understanding, independence, or creativity. Beagles are excellent with children and this is one of the reasons they have become popular family pets. Beagles are pack animals; they are prone to separation anxiety, a condition which causes them to destroy things when left unattended. Not all Beagles will howl, but most will bark when confronted with strange situations, and some will bay (also referred to as "speaking", "giving tongue", or "opening") when they catch the scent of potential quarry. They also generally get along well with cats and other dogs. They are not too demanding with regard to exercise; their inbred stamina means they do not easily tire when exercised, but they also do not need to be worked to exhaustion before they will rest. Regular exercise helps ward off the weight gain to which the breed is prone.

== Health ==
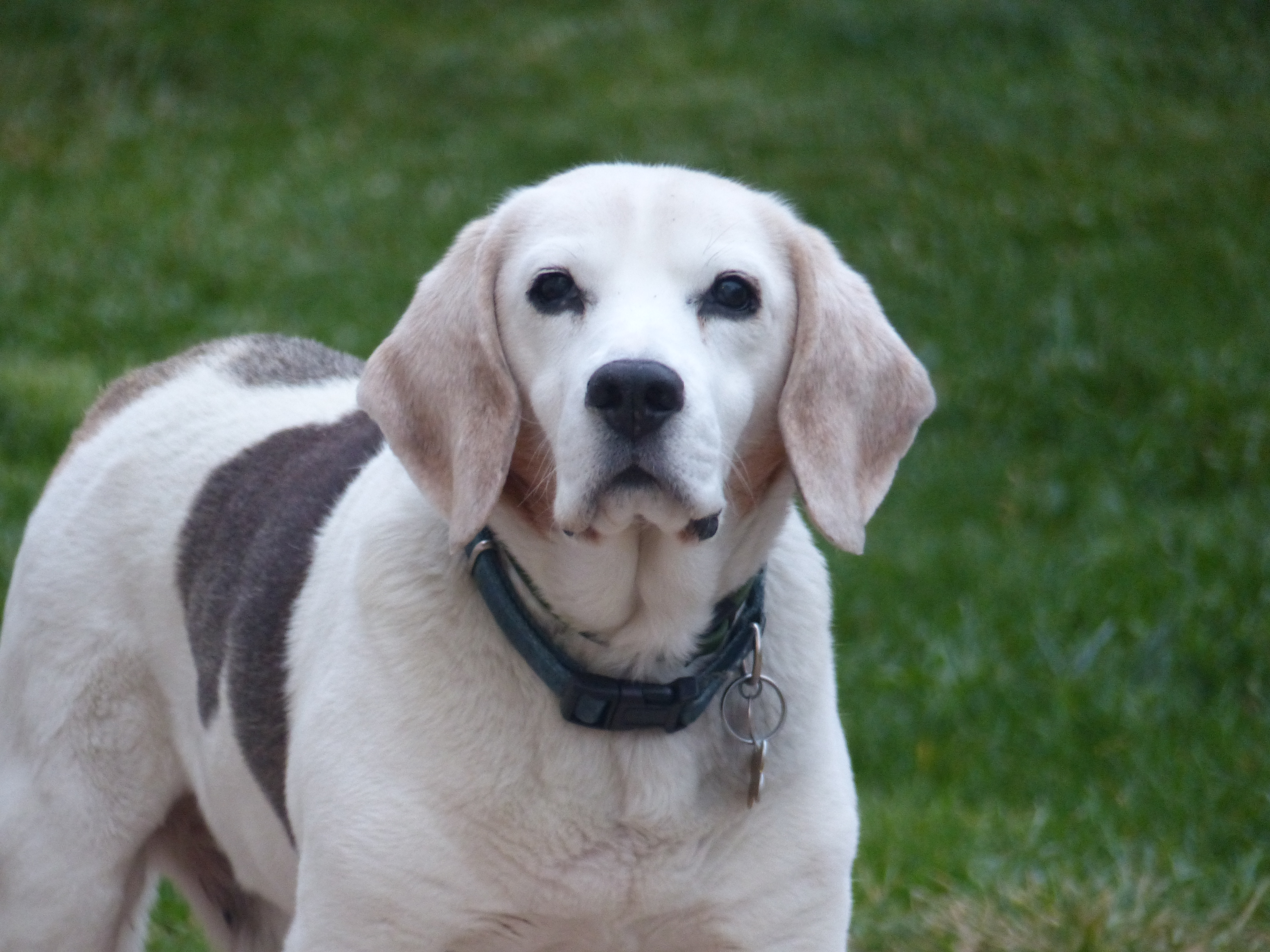
A more senior Beagle, at approximately 15 years old.

A 2024 study in the UK found a life expectancy of 12.5 years compared to an average of 12.7 for purebreeds and 12 for crossbreeds. A 2024 Italian study found a life expectancy of 11 years for the breed compared to 10 years overall.

Beagles may be prone to epilepsy, but this can often be controlled with medication. Hypothyroidism and a number of types of dwarfism occur in Beagles. Two conditions in particular are unique to the breed: "Funny Puppy", in which the puppy is slow to develop and eventually develops weak legs, a crooked back and although normally healthy, is prone to a range of illnesses; and Musladin-Lueke syndrome (MLS) in which the eyes are slanted and the outer toes are underdeveloped but otherwise development is as normal. Hip dysplasia, common in Harriers and in some larger breeds, is rarely considered a problem in Beagles. Beagles are considered a chondrodystrophic breed, meaning that they are prone to types of disk diseases.

In rare cases, Beagles may develop immune mediated polygenic arthritis (where the immune system attacks the joints) even at a young age. The symptoms can sometimes be relieved by steroid treatments. Another rare disease in the breed is neonatal cerebellar cortical degeneration. Affected puppies are slow, have lower co-ordination, fall more often, and do not have a normal gait. It has an estimated carrier rate of 5% and affected rate of 0.1%. A genetic test is available.

Their long floppy ears can mean that the inner ear does not receive a substantial air flow or that moist air becomes trapped, and this can lead to ear infections. Beagles may also be affected by a range of eye problems; two common ophthalmic conditions in beagles are glaucoma and corneal dystrophy. "Cherry eye", a prolapse of the gland of the third eyelid, and distichiasis, a condition in which eyelashes grow into the eye causing irritation, sometimes exist; both these conditions can be corrected with surgery. They can suffer from several types of retinal atrophy. Failure of the nasolacrimal drainage system can cause dry eye or leakage of tears onto the face. The cause of primary open angle glaucoma in the Beagle is an autosomal recessive mutation in the ADAMTS10 gene.

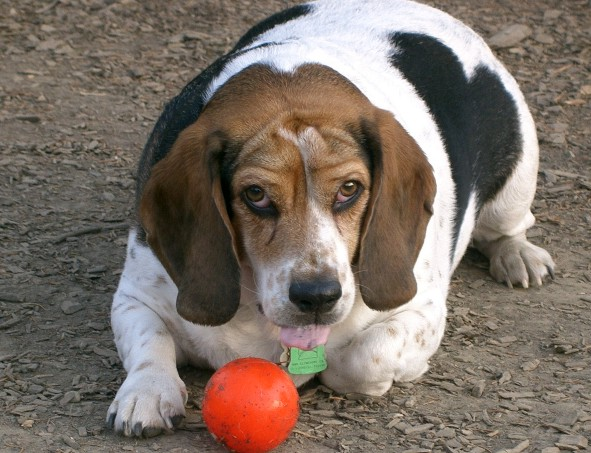
Weight gain can be a problem in older or sedentary dogs, which in turn can lead to heart and joint problems.

As field dogs they are prone to minor injuries such as cuts and sprains, and if inactive, obesity is a common problem as they will eat whenever food is available and rely on their owners to regulate their weight. When working or running free they are also likely to pick up parasites such as fleas, ticks, harvest mites, and tapeworms, and irritants such as grass seeds can become trapped in their eyes, soft ears, or paws.

Beagles may exhibit a behaviour known as reverse sneezing, in which they sound as if they are choking or gasping for breath, but are actually drawing air in through the mouth and nose. The exact cause of this behaviour is not known, but it can be a common occurrence and is not harmful to the dog.

Canine juvenile polyarteritis syndrome, also known as juvenile polyarteritis syndrome of beagle dogs is a multisystemic necrotising vasculitis of the small arteries. The condition is characterised by a reoccurrent acute fever and cervicalgia over a period of 3-7 days. The Beagle is predisposed with most reports concerning the breed — whence the name 'Beagle pain syndrome'.

== Hunting ==
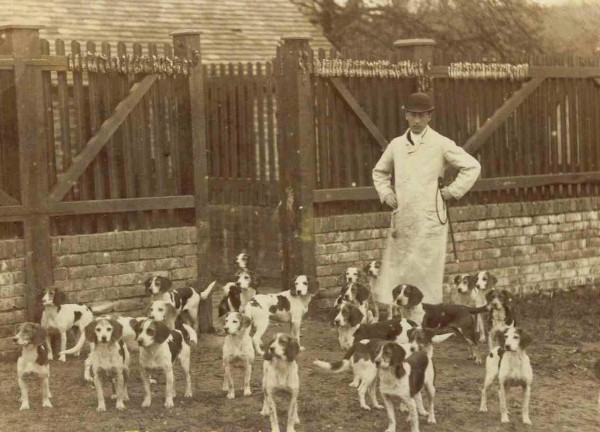
The Caynsham Foot Beagles (c. 1885)

Beagles were developed primarily for hunting rabbit or hare, an activity known as beagling. They were seen as ideal hunting companions for the elderly who could follow on horseback without exerting themselves, for young hunters who could keep up with them on ponies, and for the poorer hunters who could not afford to maintain a stable of good hunting horses. Before the advent of the fashion for foxhunting in the 19th century, hunting was an all day event where the enjoyment was derived from the chase rather than the kill. In this setting, the tiny Beagle was well matched to the hare, as unlike Harriers they would not quickly finish the hunt, but because of their excellent scent-tracking skills and stamina they were almost guaranteed to eventually catch the hare. The Beagle packs would run closely together ("so close that they might be covered with a sheet") which was useful in a long hunt, as it prevented stray dogs from obscuring the trail. In thick undergrowth they were also preferred to spaniels when hunting pheasant.

With the fashion for faster hunts, the beagle fell out of favour for chasing hare, but was still employed for rabbit hunting. In Anecdotes of Dogs (1846), Edward Jesse says:

In rabbit-shooting, in gorse and thick cover, nothing can be more cheerful than the beagle. They also are easily heard over long distances and in thick cover. They have been called rabbit-beagles from this employment, for which they are peculiarly qualified, especially those dogs which are somewhat wire-haired.

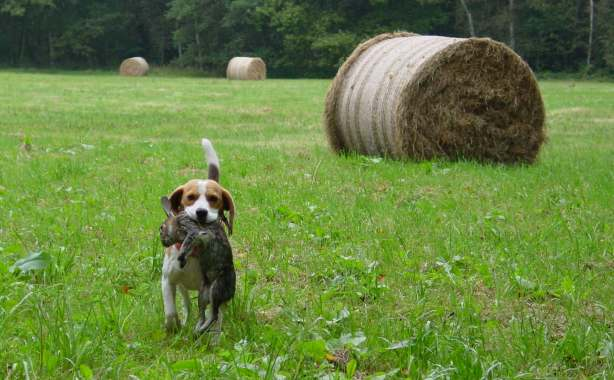
The Beagle has been used for rabbit-hunting since the earliest development of the breed.

In the United States they appear to have been employed chiefly for hunting rabbits from the earliest imports. Hunting hare with Beagles became popular again in Britain in the mid-19th century and continued until it was made illegal in Scotland by the Protection of Wild Mammals (Scotland) Act 2002, and in England and Wales by the Hunting Act 2004. Under this legislation, Beagles may still pursue rabbits with the landowner's permission. Drag hunting is popular where hunting is no longer permitted or for those owners who do not wish to participate in hunting a live animal, but still wish to exercise their dog's innate skills.

The traditional foot pack consists of up to 40 Beagles, marshaled by a Huntsman who directs the pack and who is assisted by a variable number of whippers-in whose job is to return straying hounds to the pack. The Master of the Hunt is in overall day-to-day charge of the pack, and may or may not take on the role of Huntsman on the day of the hunt.

As hunting with Beagles was seen as ideal for young people, many of the British public schools traditionally maintained Beagle packs. Protests were lodged against Eton's use of Beagles for hunting as early as 1902 but the pack is still in existence today. In 2001, the Wye College beagle pack was taken by the Animal Liberation Front. School and university packs are still maintained by Eton, Marlborough, Radley, the Royal Agricultural University, and Christ Church, Oxford.

In addition to organised beagling, Beagles have been used for hunting or flushing to guns (often in pairs) a wide range of game including snowshoe hare, cottontail rabbits, game birds, roe deer, red deer, bobcat, coyote, wild boar, and foxes, and have even been recorded as being used to hunt stoat. In most of these cases, the beagle is employed as a gun dog, flushing game for hunter's guns.

== Detection ==
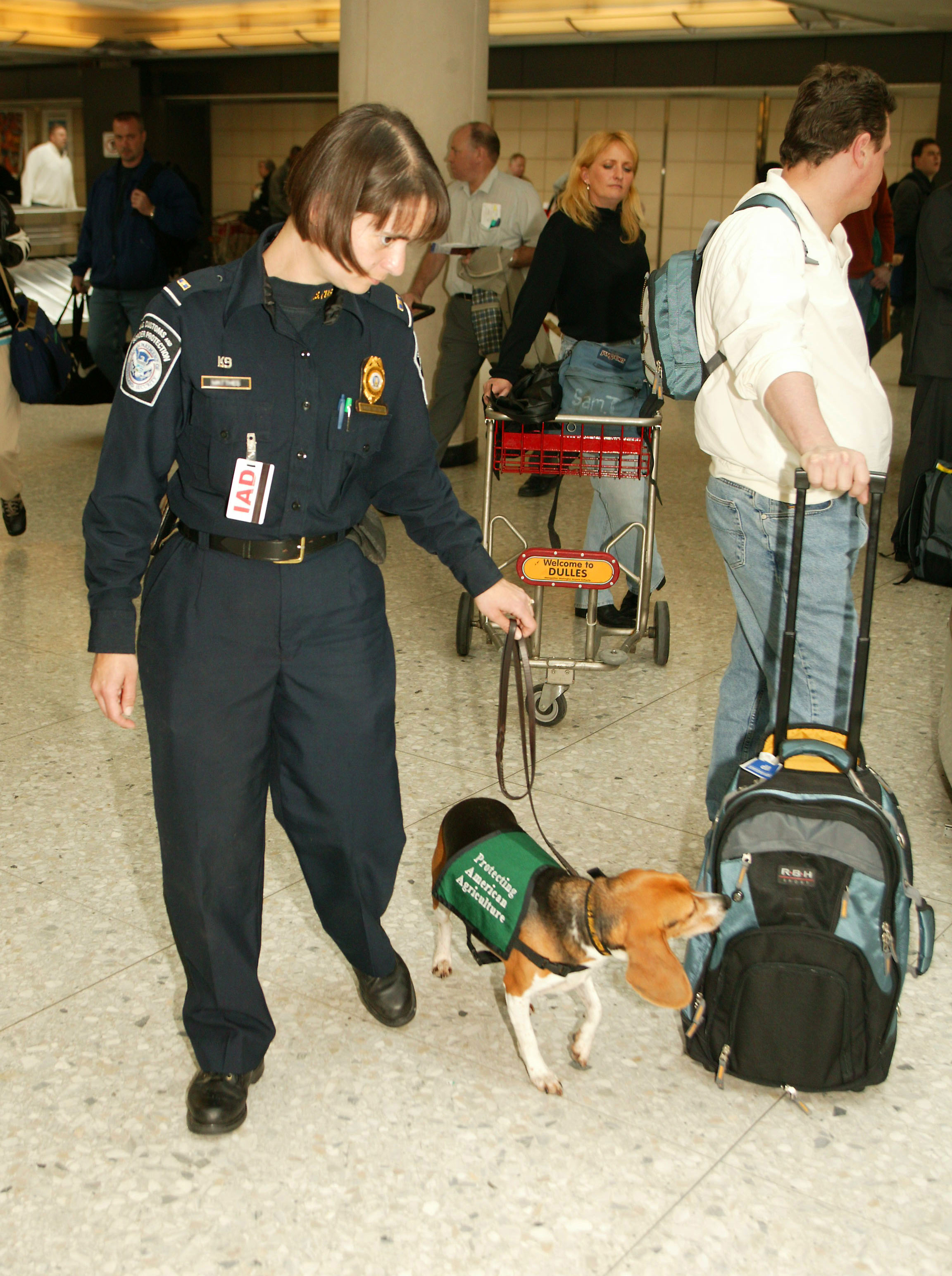
Beagles have excellent noses; this dog is employed by the US Customs and Border Protection Agency.

Beagles are used as detection dogs in the Beagle Brigade of the United States Department of Agriculture. These dogs are used to detect food items in luggage being taken into the United States. After trialling several breeds, Beagles were chosen because they are relatively small and unintimidating for people who are uncomfortable around dogs, easy to care for, intelligent and work well for rewards. They are also used for this purpose in a number of other countries including by the Ministry of Agriculture and Forestry in New Zealand, the Australian Quarantine and Inspection Service, and in Canada, Japan, and the People's Republic of China. Larger breeds are generally used for detection of explosives as this often involves climbing over luggage and on large conveyor belts, work for which the smaller Beagle is not suited.

== Use in animal testing ==
Beagles are one of the dog breeds most often used in animal testing, due to their size, temperament, and historical utilisation. In the United States, as many as 65,000 Beagles are used every year for medical, cosmetic, beauty, and other chemical tests. Most are bred specifically for this purpose, by companies such as Envigo, and live inside controlled laboratory facilities.

Beagles are used in a range of research procedures: fundamental biological research, applied human medicine, applied veterinary medicine, and protection of man, animals, or the environment. Of the 8,018 dogs used in testing in the UK in 2004, 7,799 were Beagles (97.3%). In the UK, the Animals (Scientific Procedures) Act 1986 gave special status to primates, equids, cats and dogs and in 2005 the Animal Procedures Committee (set up by the act) ruled that testing on mice was preferable, even though a greater number of individual animals were involved. In 2005, Beagles were involved in less than 0.3% of the total experiments on animals in the UK, but of the 7,670 experiments performed on dogs 7,406 involved Beagles (96.6%). In the UK, companies breeding animals for research must be licensed under the Animals (Scientific Procedures) Act.

=== Bans and activism against Beagle testing ===
Testing of cosmetic products on animals is banned in the member states of the European Community, although France protested the ban and has made efforts to have it lifted. It is permitted in the United States but is not mandatory if safety can be ascertained by other methods, and the test species is not specified by the Food and Drug Administration (FDA). When testing toxicity of food additives, food contaminants, and some drugs and chemicals the FDA uses Beagles and miniature pigs as surrogates for direct human testing. The Beagle Freedom Project has successfully advocated for Beagles to be adopted or released from labs. Minnesota was the first state to enact a Beagle Freedom adoption law in 2014, mandating that dogs and cats are allowed to be adopted once they have completed research testing.

Anti-vivisection groups have reported on abuse of animals inside testing facilities. In 1997 footage secretly filmed by a freelance journalist inside Huntingdon Life Sciences in the UK showed staff punching and screaming at Beagles. Consort Kennels, a UK-based breeder of Beagles for testing, closed down in 1997 after pressure from animal rights groups.

There are various examples of activists utilising Freedom of Information Act (FOIA) requests to obtain information about taxpayer funding of animal testing. The White Coat Waste Project reported that the National Institute of Allergy and Infectious Diseases funded experiments in which 28 Beagles were infected by disease-causing parasites and that dogs taking part in the experiments were "vocalizing in pain." In response, People for the Ethical Treatment of Animals (PETA) called on all members of the National Institute of Health to resign and stated that there is a "need to find a new NIH director to replace the outgoing Francis Collins who will shut down research that violates the dignity of nonhuman animals."

=== Animal welfare research ===
A 2023 research article report lower levels of the stress hormone cortisol in beagles kept in larger areas with toys.

A 2024 article researches the use of environmental enrichment in lab beagles by adding toys to their cages.

== Other roles ==
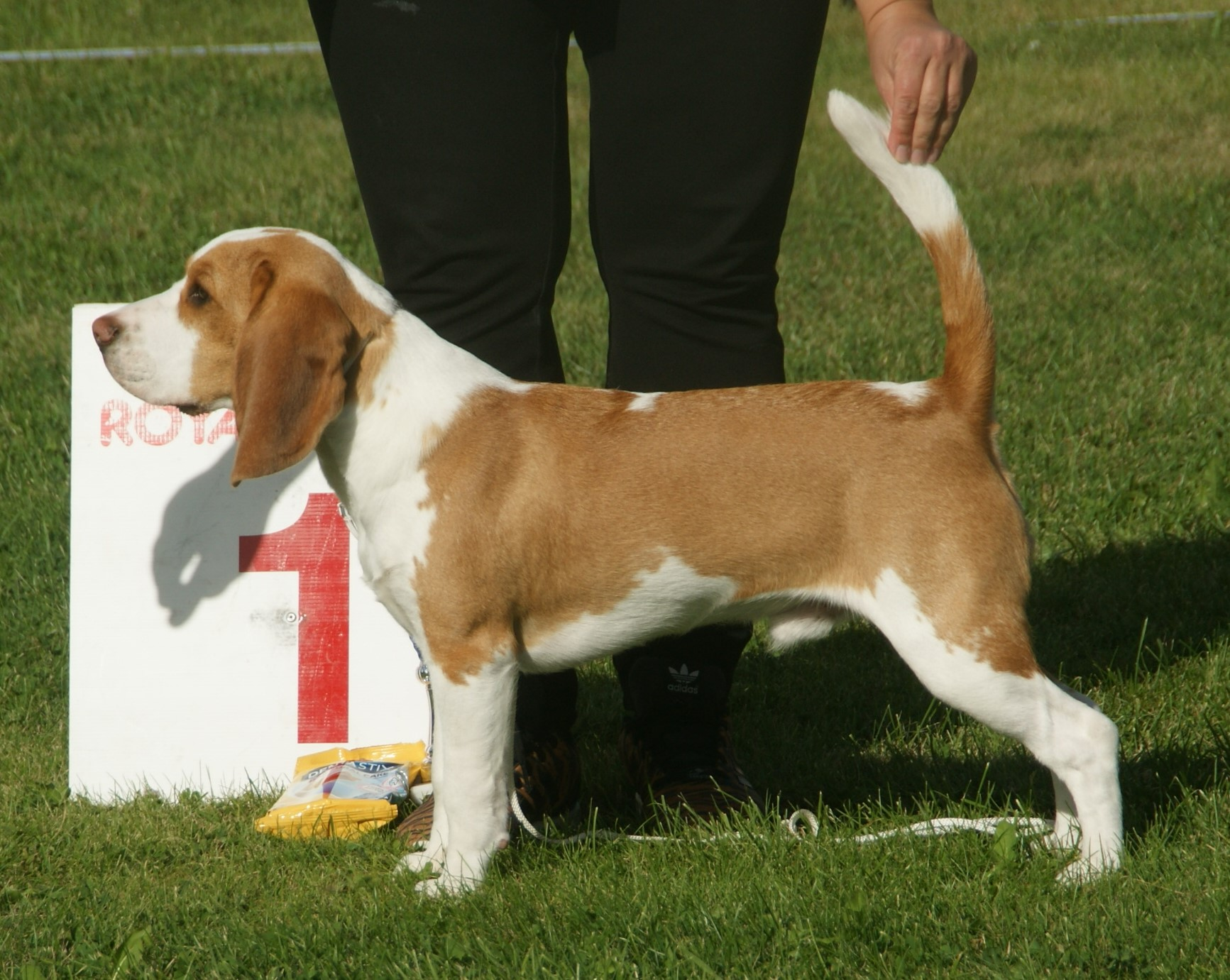
Red & white Beagle

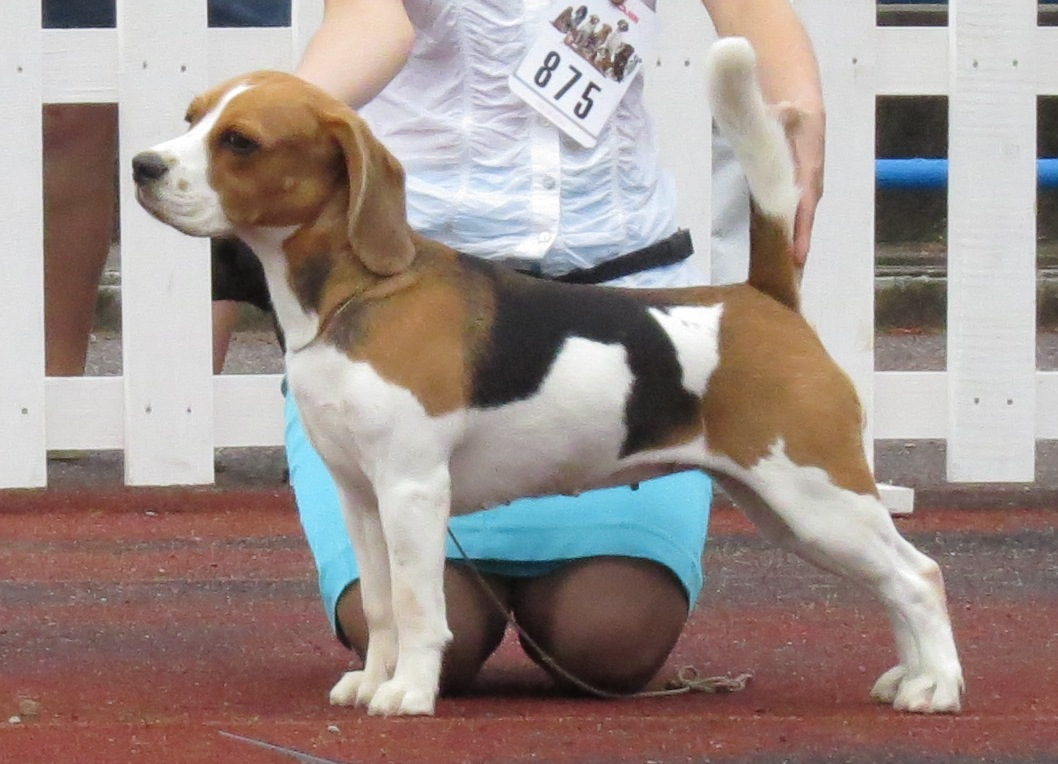
Tricolor Beagle

Although bred for hunting, Beagles are versatile and are nowadays employed for various other roles in detection, therapy, and as family pets.

Beagles are used as sniffer dogs for termite detection in Australia, and have been mentioned as possible candidates for drug and explosive detection. Because of their gentle nature and unimposing build, they are also frequently used in pet therapy, visiting the sick and elderly in hospital. In June 2006, a trained Beagle assistance dog was credited with saving the life of its owner after using her owner's mobile phone to dial an emergency number. In the aftermath of the 2010 Haiti earthquake, a Beagle search and rescue dog with a Colombian rescue squad was credited with locating the owner of the Hôtel Montana, who was subsequently rescued after spending 100 hours buried in the rubble. Beagles were hired by New York City to help with bedbug detection, although some have expressed doubts about the role of such dogs in this type of detection.

== Notable dogs ==
- Uno, who in 2008 became the first Beagle to win the Westminster Kennel Club Dog Show
- Miss P, winner of the 2015 Westminster Kennel Club Dog Show
