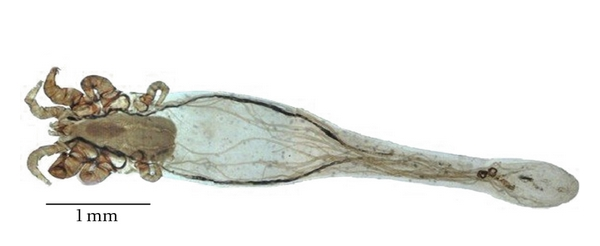

Scientific classification
- Kingdom: Animalia
- Phylum: Arthropoda
- Subphylum: Chelicerata
- Class: Arachnida
- Order: Mesostigmata
- Family: Halarachnidae
- Genus: Orthohalarachne; Newell, 1947
- Species: O. attenuata

Binomial name
- Orthohalarachne attenuata (Banks, 1901)

= Orthohalarachne =

Orthohalarachne attenuata

Genus of mites

Orthohalarachne attenuata (family: Halarachnidae) is a species of mite normally found in the nasal passages of fur seals, sea lions, and walruses. In seals, the mites can be both prevalent (almost every single seal has them) and abundant (more than 1000 mites per seal). Although clinical observations and gross examination indicate that O. attenuata parasitization alone is not serious, some erosion and inflammation of the nasal turbinates and nasopharynx in seals has been observed in histological sections. If concomitant parasitization with O. attenuata and O. diminuta occurs, alveolar emphysema and more serious ailments can threaten the life of the mammal.

== Morphology ==
Mature mites are shown to be elongated in the posterior part of body to form a club-shape with the rounded posterior extremity. Ten to twelve transverse rows of 8 to 12 sharp denticules and a few rows of minute spines are present on the ventral surface of the capitulum and the posterior surface of coxa III, respectively.

== Transmission ==
The usual mode of host-to-host transmission by Orthohalarachne is thought to be accomplished by active larvae that crawl or are sneezed from one animal to another. Both males and females are relatively non-motile and have well-developed claws from maintaining their position in the nares.

== Prevalence and pathology ==
There is almost 100% prevalence of infestation of the nasal mite in the northern fur seal (Callorhinus ursinus) on the Pribilof Islands. Mucosal erosion was observed in the nasal turbinates as well as the nasopharynx. Based on clinical observation, the effects of the mite are of minor impairment, however, heavy infection have been shown to lead to more serious problems, such as impairment of respiration, lesions in the lungs and secondary alveolar emphysema.

== Human incidences ==
The first known human incidence of transmission from walrus to human happened at SeaWorld in San Diego, California. A 35-year-old Caucasian man recalled seeing the walruses spitting and snorting, and later feeling irritation in his eye. Three days after his visit to SeaWorld, the mite specimen was discovered and recovered from the lower part of his ocular iris. Pathological changes in the affected areas by the mites were a marked abrasion of the mucosa and destruction and necrosis of the deeply placed tissues by the action of the legs, palps and chelicerae of the mites.
