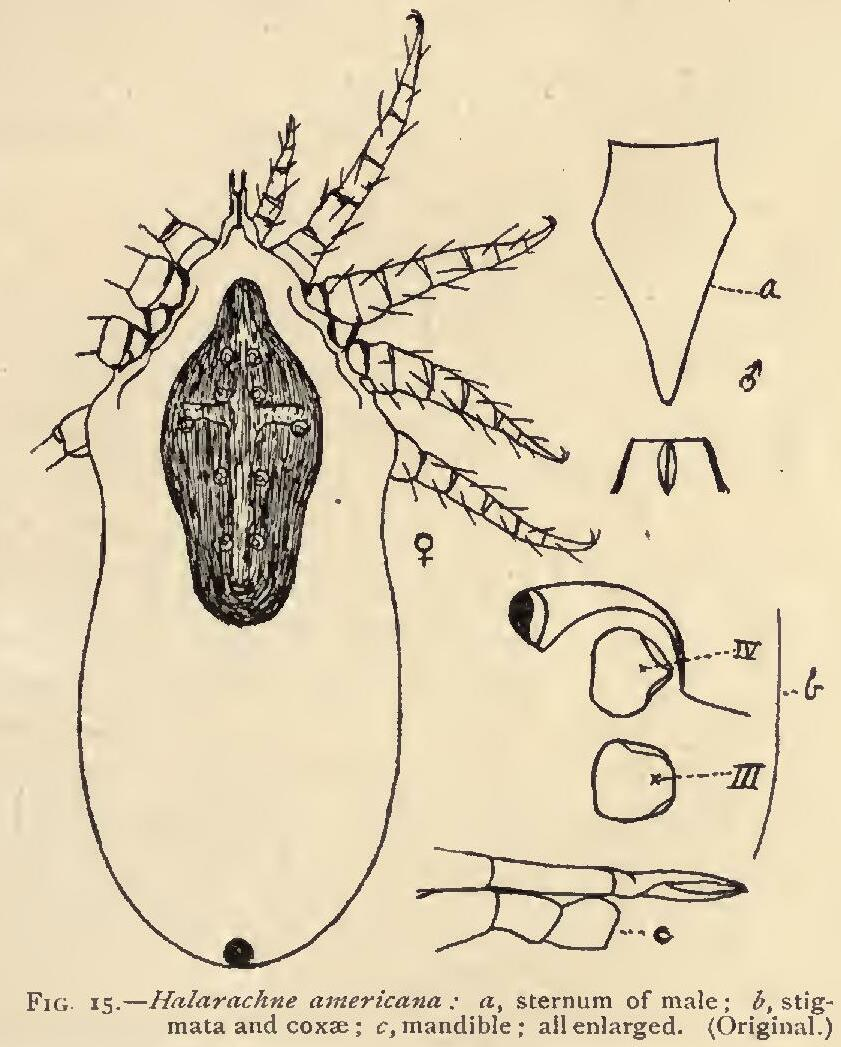
- Halarachne americana

Scientific classification
- Kingdom: Animalia
- Phylum: Arthropoda
- Subphylum: Chelicerata
- Class: Arachnida
- Order: Mesostigmata
- Family: Halarachnidae
- Genus: Halarachne; Allmann

= Halarachne =

Genus of mites

Halarachne is a genus of mites belonging to the family Halarachnidae. They are often found in phocids.

Species:

- †Halarachne americana Banks, 1899
- Halarachne halichoeri Allman, 1847
- Halarachne laysanae Furman & Dailey, 1980
