= Musladin-Lueke syndrome =

Musladin-Lueke syndrome (previously known as Chinese Beagle syndrome or ballerina Beagle syndrome) is a hereditary disorder that affects beagles that manifests in extensive fibrosis of the skin and joints. It is named after beagle breeders Anton Musladin, Judith Musladin, and Ada Lueke. It is caused by a number of recessive mutations affecting fibrillin-1, a major component of microfibrils. It affects several organ systems, including the skeleton, heart, skin, and muscle. According to the American Kennel Club's Canine Health Foundation, "beagles with Musladin-Lueke syndrome are born with several defects characterized by short outer toes on the front and sometimes all four feet, high set creased ears on a flat skull with extra cartilage in them, slant narrowed eyes, and very thick tight skin with little scruff." Affected dogs are usually smaller than average, and have a very stiff gait. Seizures have also been noted in affected dogs.
