= Beagling =

Hunting of hares and rabbits by beagle dogs

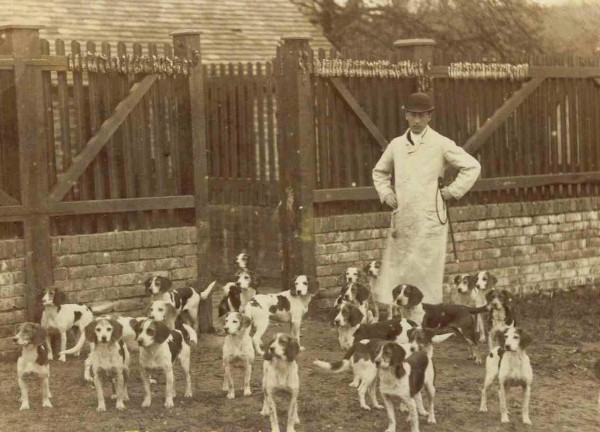
The Caynsham Foot Beagles (c. 1885)

Beagling is mainly the hunting of hares and rabbits by beagles using their strong sense of smell. A beagle pack (10 or more hounds) is usually followed on foot, but in a few cases mounted. Beagling is often enjoyed by 'retired' fox hunters who have either sustained too many injuries or lost the agility to ride horseback, or who enjoy the outdoors and the camaraderie of the hunt. It is also traditionally a way for young men and women to learn how to handle hounds on a smaller scale before they go on to hunt with foxhounds.

== Quarry ==
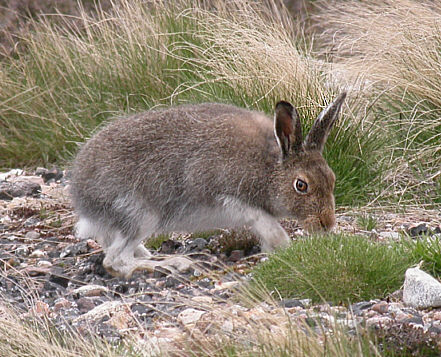
Irish hare in its summer pelage

In the UK and Ireland, the traditional quarry of beagle packs has been the hare. In the UK, the brown hare was hunted, whereas in Ireland the Irish hare is hunted. It was estimated that before the Hunting Act 2004 beagle packs in the UK collectively caught 1,650 hares per season, meaning each pack caught 20 hares. That Act banned hare hunting in its traditional style, like fox hunting, in England and Wales. It bans the hunting of most wild mammals (including hares) with certain exemptions, which include the retrieval of hares that have been shot.

== People ==
Hunts are managed very similarly to foxhound packs - generally governed by one or more Masters, who typically take much of the financial responsibility for the overall management of the hunt. A hunt will traditionally have a Huntsman, a full-time employee of the hunt, who is responsible (in conjunction with assistants, known as "whippers-in") for directing and controlling the hounds during the course of the day.

The attire for traditional beagling on foot normally consists of a green coat and stockings, white breeches and a cap (similar in style to those worn when riding a horse), or a green flat cap. Many packs have a coloured collar to distinguish themselves from other packs. As with foxhounds a handful of packs have a different coloured uniform, either red or blue coats being worn, while in a few hunts the huntsman's coat may be a different colour from those worn by the whippers in. Beagles generally have a higher pitched "cry" when hunting a line than foxhounds do.

== Beagling in the United States ==
Modern beagling is done both for hunt as well as sport. Organized clubs under the American Kennel Club track points in events called field trials. Dogs run as packs, often in groups of 5–8.

Presently, the Northeast Beagle Gundog Federation represents 39 clubs. The current president is Blaine Grove and the vice president is John Jarzynski.

== Beagle packs in the UK ==
At one time, many famous public schools and universities had packs of beagles. Now, however, only four schools (Eton, Radley, Stowe, and Marlborough) have a pack, whilst only three university packs remain (the Christ Church and Farley Hill Beagles of Oxford University, the Trinity Foot and South Herts Beagles of the University of Cambridge, and the Royal Agricultural University Beagles). Some packs of beagles also have associations with the British armed forces, such as the Purbeck and Bovington Beagles (Junior Leaders Regiment, Royal Armoured Corps); the Pimpernel (Royal Signals) Beagles; the Catterick Garrison Beagles; the Colchester Garrison Beagles (amalgamated with the Sproughton Foot Beagles in 1994 to form the Stour Valley Beagles); Per Ardua Beagles (RAF) and Britannia Beagles (Royal Navy). The harrier and beagle packs are represented by the Association of Masters of Harriers and Beagles (AMHB). There are currently over sixty packs of beagles registered with the Association based in England and Wales.

Since the 1980s there have been a number of amalgamations between packs, mostly brought about by the reduction in the amount of country available for hunting due to roads and associated urban development. This means that some packs, particularly in more built up areas of southern England, cover parts of several counties.

Following the 2004 Hunting Act, packs of beagles, bassets and harriers have switched to hunting artificial (rabbit or hare scent) pre-laid trails, hunting rabbits, flushing hares to guns or birds of prey or retrieval of injured hares following hare shoots (the last three are legal under exemptions within the Act).

== Other forms of hare hunting ==
=== Hunting with basset hounds ===
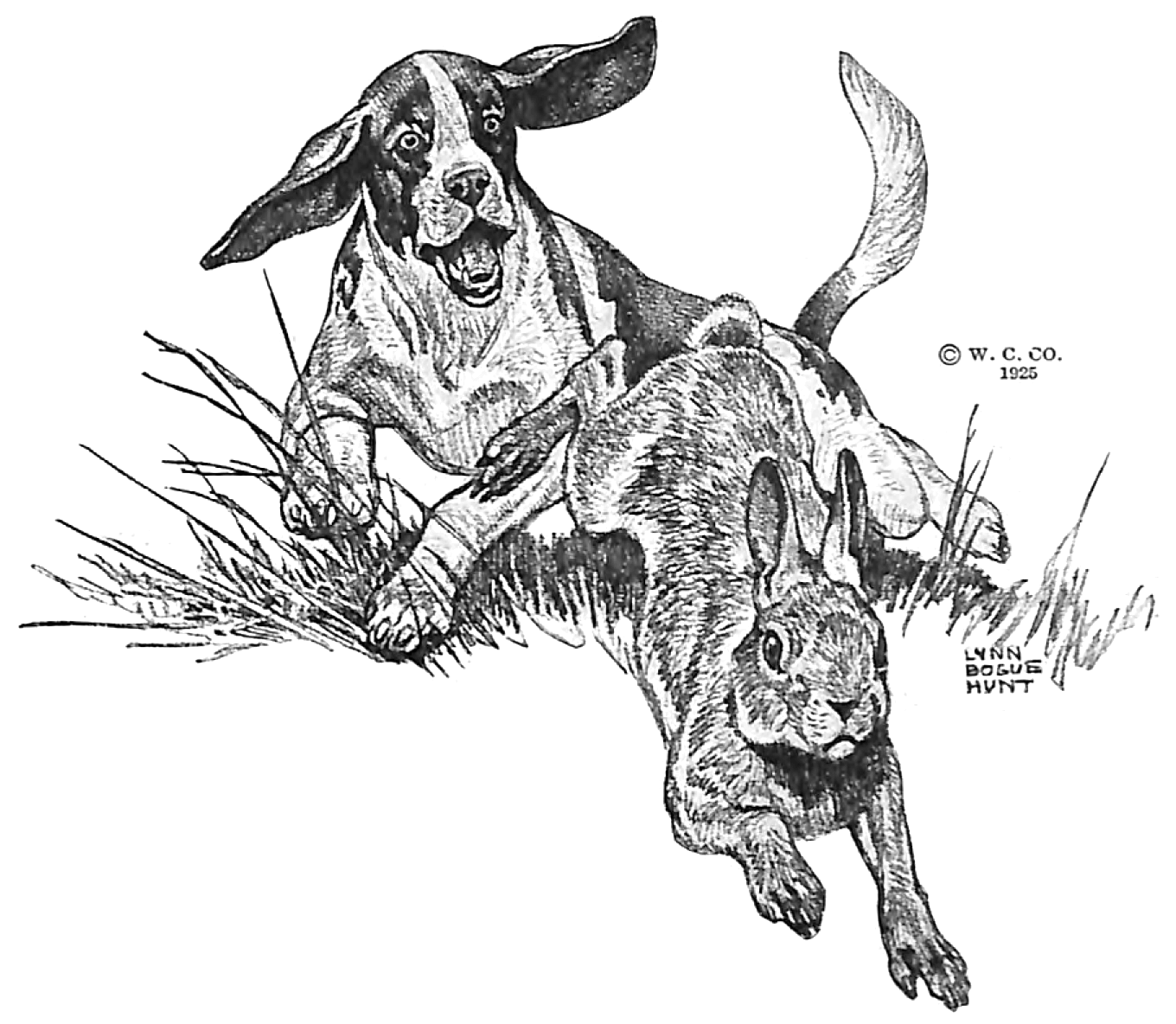
A 1925 illustration of a basset hound hunting a rabbit

In the United Kingdom, there are also a handful of basset hound packs, which formerly hunted hare. Despite being less thorough and "checking" less frequently, bassets work more slowly than beagles, but are admired by many for their strong and deep voice, and for their considerable stamina. They are more independent and headstrong hounds; it has been said that they hunt "less as a pack, and more as a collection of like-minded individuals". Most packs have opted to breed the 'English Basset', which is considerably longer in the leg and lighter boned than the traditional variety. This gives them greater speed and endurance when hunting, but many also have a slightly higher pitch when speaking on a line (scent). The UK governing body for basset hound packs is the Masters of Basset Hounds Association (MBHA), separate from the Association of Masters of Harriers and Beagles.

=== Hunting with Harriers ===
Harriers are normally followed on horseback as the hounds, being larger than beagles, could push a hare faster and straighter, enabling a mounted following to pursue the hounds as in foxhunting.

==== United Kingdom ====
Most packs of hare hunting harriers in the last 30 years have been based in East Anglia, where hares have always been far more plentiful than foxes, and in the Pennines of Yorkshire and Lancashire.

At the start of the 20th century there were many more packs of harriers in the UK than beagles. The proportions are now reversed, largely because many packs of harriers have changed to hunting foxes over the last 80 years or so. In the south west of England some packs still hunt with West Country Harriers, although they hunted foxes rather than hares before the ban, while many current packs of foxhounds started off as hare hunting harrier packs.

Some packs in the first part of the 20th century used a heavier, more old-fashioned type of hound to hunt hares, and were followed on foot. This continued to some extent until the Second World War, while the last pack of foot harriers, the Windermere, which hunted in the Lake District, disbanded in the early 1990s. Some foot harrier packs disbanded, but many changed over to beagles as suitable harrier bloodlines died out.

In 2022 there are currently only 13 Harrier Packs (8 Stud Book, 5 West Country) meaning that there are now under 750 Harriers left in the UK and only 300 West Country Harriers left in the World.

==== Ireland ====
In Ireland there are more harrier packs than foxhound or beagle packs, with the greatest concentration in the south of the country. In Ireland a sub-species of the mountain hare is endemic and hunted in lieu of the European hare of Great Britain.

==== New Zealand ====
There are no land based mammals native to New Zealand; all species found there were introduced. The hare was introduced as a quarry species in 1851; the fox was never introduced, so there are no fox hunting packs in New Zealand; instead all hunts there are mounted hare hunts or drag hunts which hunt with harriers.

The first hounds to be brought to New Zealand were beagles, imported in 1868 by Governor George Grey. The first pack of harriers was imported in 1873, becoming the Pakuranga Hunt, followed by the Christchurch Hunt in 1880.

Today there are 28 packs of harriers in New Zealand; predominantly they are hare hunts, but the Waitemata Hunt is a drag hunt.

== See also ==
- Rabbit hunting
- Hare coursing
- Fox hunting
- Airedale Beagles
