= Immune mediated polygenic arthritis =

An immune mediated inflammation of the joints of an animal caused by a dysfunction of the immune system, which attacks various components of the joint. This leads to variable degrees of synovitis, and typically occurs in multiple joints (a polyarthritis). The condition is hereditary (e.g. beagles), and caused by defects at multiple gene loci.
