= Harrier (dog breed) =

Medium-sized hound bred for hunting hares by trailing them

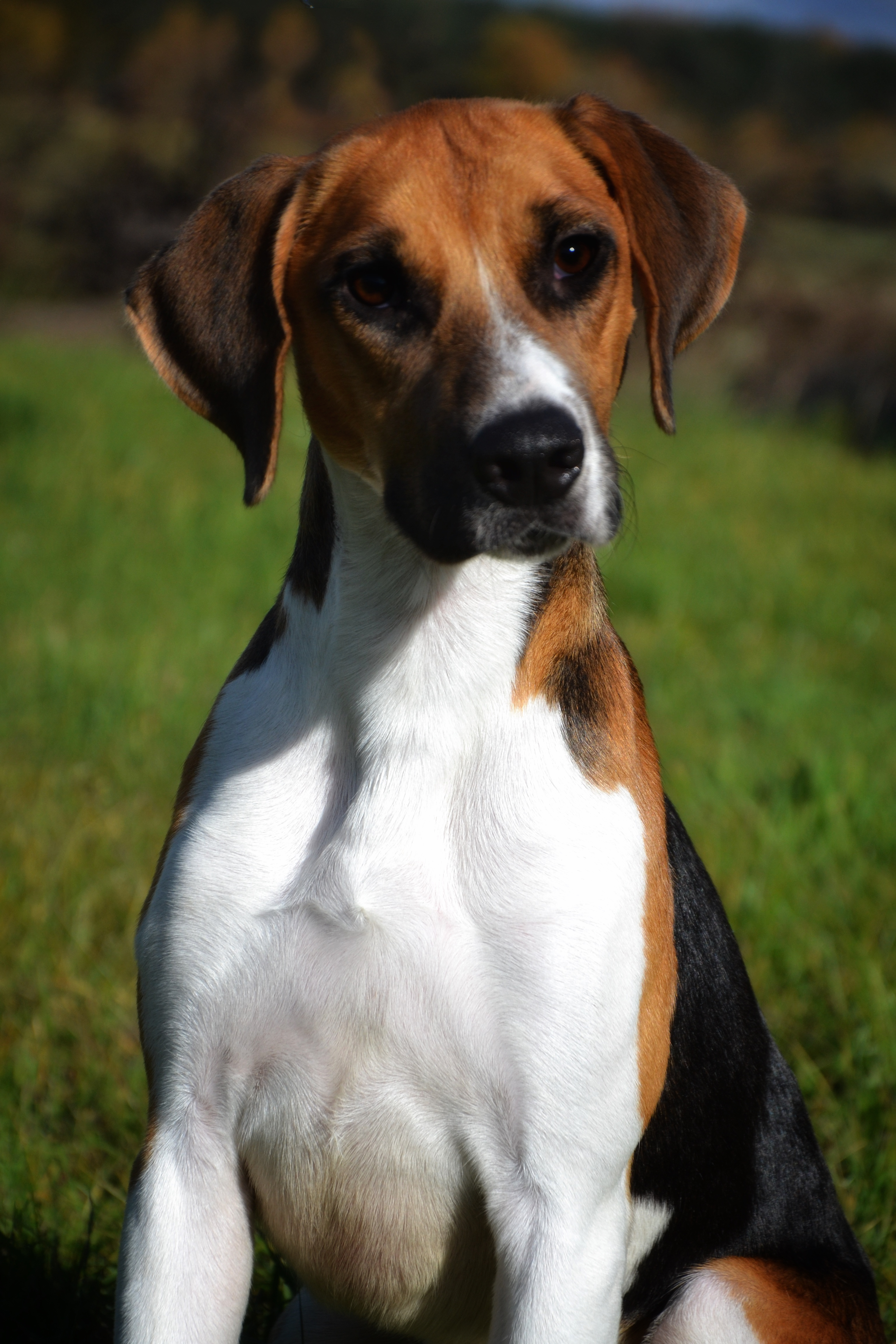
- A tri-colour Harrier
- Origin: United Kingdom
Kennel club standards
- The Kennel Club: standard
- Fédération Cynologique Internationale: standard

The Harrier is a medium-sized dog breed of the hound class, used for hunting hares by trailing them. It resembles an English Foxhound but is slightly smaller, though not as small as a Beagle. The breed has been used since the mid-13th century.

== Description ==
=== Appearance ===
The Harrier is similar to the English Foxhound, but smaller. Harriers stand between 19 and 21 inches (48-53cms) at the shoulder, and adults weigh between 45 and 65 lbs (20-30kgs). They do shed, have short hair and hanging ears, and come in a variety of color patterns. A humorous description of a Harrier is that of "a Beagle on steroids", despite its resemblance to an English Foxhound. It is a muscular hunting hound with a small, hard coat. It has large bones for stamina and strength. The Harrier is slightly longer than tall, with a level topline. The tail is medium-length, carried high, but is not curled over the back. The skull is broad with a strong square muzzle. The rounded ears are pendant, and the eyes are either brown or hazel. The wide nose is black. The expression is mellow when the dog is relaxed and alert when he is excited. The teeth should meet in a scissors or level bite. The feet are tight and cat-like, and the front toes may turn inward.

=== Temperament ===
The Harrier is cheerful, sweet-tempered, tolerant of people, and it is excellent with children. This pack dog is good with other dogs, but should be supervised with non-canine pets unless it is raised with them from puppyhood. It prefers life in a pack with people, dogs, or both. This active dog likes to go exploring, sniffing, and trailing, so be sure to keep it on a leash or in a safe enclosed area. Some Harriers like to bay.

== Health ==
This breed's lifespan is generally 12–15 years. Hip dysplasia is known to occur in this breed.

== Care ==
The coat needs only occasional brushing to remove dead hair.

=== Exercise ===
The Harrier requires daily exercise, such as long vigorous walks or runs. Without appropriate exercise, the Harrier can become hyperactive, overweight and/or destructive. While this dog was bred to run and work all day long and cannot be satisfied by a completely sedentary lifestyle, they adapt very well to the average home.

== History ==
Sources have widely conflicting stories about the origins of this breed. According to one, the earliest Harrier types were crossed with Bloodhounds, the Talbot Hound, and even the Basset Hound. According to another, the breed was probably developed from crosses of the English Foxhound with Fox Terrier and Greyhound. Yet another regards the Harrier as simply a bred-down version of the English Foxhound.

In any case, today's Harrier is between the Beagle and English Foxhound in size and was developed primarily to hunt hares, though the breed has also been used in fox hunting. The name, "Harrier", reveals the breed's specialty - compare "harehound". The Harrier has a long history of popularity as a working pack-dog in England.

The Harrier is the most commonly used hound by hunts in Ireland, with 166 harrier packs, 37 of them mounted packs and 129 of them foot packs, spread throughout the country. In Ireland it is used to hunt both foxes and hares, with some packs hunting mainly foxes.

Harriers in UK

In the Victorian era, the Harrier was included in the original Kennel Club Studbook (1874) as one of the only 40 breeds recognised by the document. The last time Harriers were shown at a Kennel Club show or entered in their Studbook was in 1915. The last time they were shown at Crufts was 1898.

In 1891, the Association of Masters of Harriers and Beagles (AMHB) was founded and registered 107 Harrier packs.

From the First World War until after the Second there was a significant decline not just in Harriers but in most breeds, working dogs and pet populations. Only Foxhounds received government support for food in order to manage the fox population. At the same time many privately owned Harrier packs hunted by the owners of large estates were disbanded. In the sporting Gazette of 1898 we read of the ‘Annual Leicester sale of Harriers’ at which the entire pack of 34 couple (68 hounds) belonging to the late Mr Carleton-Cowper was sold for a total of £550.10s. A further sale only a week later offered for sale 39 couple of hounds from three different packs. Such Harrier sales continued until soon after the WWII.

It was over ten years after the war that the MFHA with the support of the Kennel Club took a firm stand to ensure that in terms of breeding there was a clear distinction between Harriers bred for the purpose of Hunting and those bred for the bench shows and pet owners.

By the middle of the 20th Century, there were fewer than 50 Harrier packs and the AMHB banned the sale of registered Harriers and strictly controlled the breeding of dogs and sale of Harriers outside other registered packs, the result being that they all but disappeared outside the hunting community. The Kennel Club eventually withdrew breed recognition in the early 1970s.

By 2013, there were only 18 Harrier Packs in the UK. In 2022, there were only 13 Harrier Packs (eight Stud Book, five West Country): there were now under 750 Harriers left in the UK, and only 300 West Country Harriers left in the world.

In France and the US, Harrier enthusiasts kept the breed going. France is the only nation with two dogs achieving world recognition with Iran des Coutas in 1974 and Alicien in 2011. In the US, Emmy was BOB at Westminster Dog Show in 2018 and Whisper was BOB in 2020.

The Harrier was recognised again by the UK Kennel Club in January 2020. As of 2022, there were over 50 pure bred Harriers registered with the KC.

At the World Dog Show 2021, British Harrier Ross Demon for Evforce was awarded the title of World Winner becoming only the third Harrier to be awarded this title (Iran de Coutas WW1974, Alician WW2011). In October 2021, the UK Kennel Club released the Interim Breed Standard, which meant that for the first time in 50 years Harriers could be shown under Kennel Club rules. The first KC show was the Ladies' Kennel Association in Birmingham on December 11, 2021, where 18 Harriers were entered in AVNSC (Any Variety Not Separately Classified).

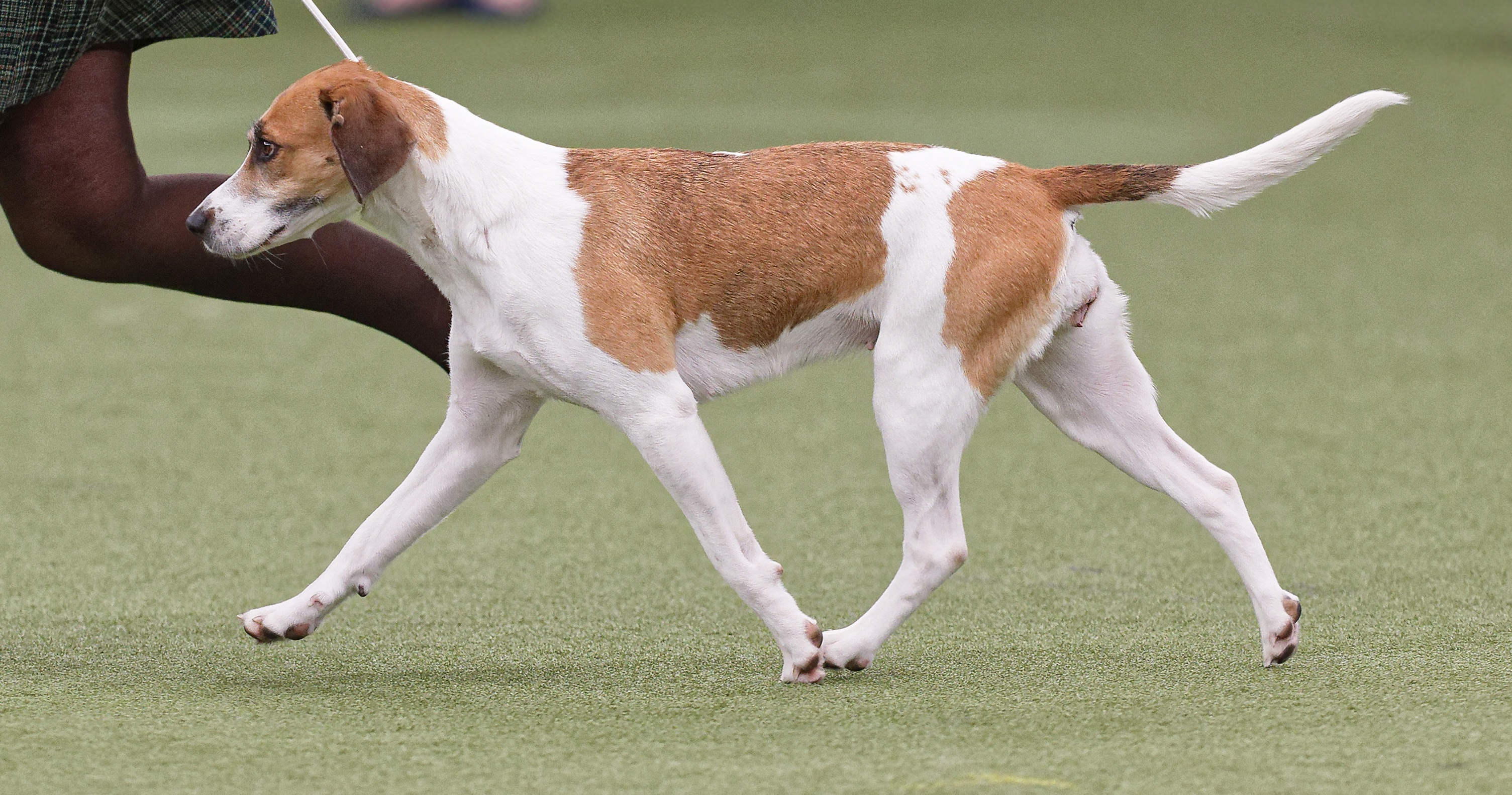
Evforce Miss Havoc at Henissy

Best Of Breed was Evforce Miss Havoc at Henissy. Best Puppy was Evforce Golden Agent. Best Veteran was Frenzy at Henissy. Crufts 2022 was to see 19 Harriers being shown for the first time in 124 years on Friday 11^{th.} In 2022, The Best of Breed title was awarded to Evforce Miss Havoc at Henissy making her the first Harrier to be awarded Best of Breed since 1898. The Junior Clint Evforce Clint West Gunner was awarded Reserve Best of Breed. Henissy Farthing was awarded Reserve Best Bitch.

In 1885, the American Kennel Club recognized the Harrier breed of dog, classified in the Hound Group.

The Harrier Club of America cites the earliest description of a Harrier in "The Chace" (by the English poet William Somervile) which was written in 1735.

== See also ==
- List of dog breeds
- Hunting with Harriers
