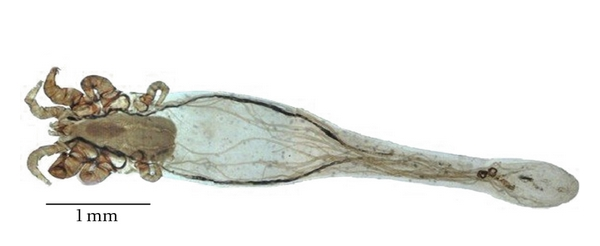
- Orthohalarachne attenuata

Scientific classification
- Kingdom: Animalia
- Phylum: Arthropoda
- Subphylum: Chelicerata
- Class: Arachnida
- Order: Mesostigmata
- Family: Halarachnidae; Oudemans, 1906

= Halarachnidae =

Family of mites

Halarachnidae is a small family of mites in the order Mesostigmata.

== Species ==
Halarachnidae contains seven genera, with ten recognized species:

- Genus Halarachne Allman, 1847
  - Halarachne halichoeri Allman, 1847
  - Halarachne laysanae Furman & Dailey, 1980
- Genus Orthohalarachne Newell, 1947
  - Orthohalarachne attenuata (Banks, 1910)
- Genus Pneumonyssoides Fain, 1955
  - Pneumonyssoides caninum (Chandler & Ruhe, 1940)
- Genus Pneumonyssus Banks, 1901
  - Pneumonyssus capricorni Domrow, 1974
  - Pneumonyssus simicola Banks, 1901
- Genus Rhinophaga Fain, 1955
  - Rhinophaga cercopitheci Fain, 1955
- Genus Sciurinyssus
  - Sciurinyssus coreaensis
- Genus Zumptiella Fain, 1962
  - Zumptiella furmani Fain, 1962
  - Zumptiella tamias Fain, Lukoschus & Whitaker, 1983
