= Calygreyhound =

Mythical creature found on medieval heraldry

The calygreyhound is a mythical creature that appears on medieval heraldry. The de Vere family, who were the Earls of Oxford, used the calygreyhound in their coat of arms in the 15th and 16th centuries. The calygreyhound may be unique to the de Veres, and unlike most heraldic monsters, it made no attempt to seem realistic.

== Description ==
The calygreyhound is described consistently as having the head of a wildcat, the torso of a deer or antelope, the claws of an eagle on its forefeet, ox hooves, antlers or horns, the hind legs of a lion or ox, and its tail like a lion or poodle. On some rare occasions, the Calygreyhound may be seen as depicted with the wings of an eagle. It is said to represent speed or swiftness. It is generally accepted that the calygreyhound is simply a figment of the artist's imagination, but some parts of it are based on reality. When it is depicted, it does not have a consistent position.
