= Pneumonyssoides =

Scientific classification
- Kingdom: Animalia
- Phylum: Arthropoda
- Subphylum: Chelicerata
- Class: Arachnida
- Order: Mesostigmata
- Family: Halarachnidae
- Genus: Pneumonyssoides; Fain, 1955
- Species: P. caninum

Binomial name
- Pneumonyssoides caninum (Chandler & Ruhe, 1940)

Genus of mites

Pneumonyssoides is a monotypic genus of mites belonging to the family Halarachnidae. The only species is Pneumonyssoides caninum. It is one of the most commonly studied species of Halarachnidae found in dogs.

They are oval shaped. Adults in this species can measure from 1.5 to 0.6 mm in length.

The species is found in North America. They have a world wide distribution.
