= Talbot (dog breed) =

Medieval dog breed

Talbot Hound
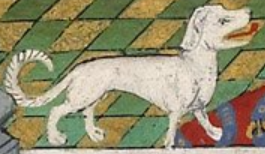
- Talbot Hound, 1445 depiction
- Origin: Uncertain, possibly Belgium / France (Normandy) or England
- Breed status: Extinct

The Talbot (also known as the St. Hubert Hound) was a type of hunting hound common in England during the Middle Ages. It is depicted in art of the period as small to medium-sized, white in colour, with short legs, large powerful feet, a deep chest with a slender waist, long drooping ears, and a very long curled tail. It is shown in one well-known example at Haddon Hall with a fierce facial expression. It is now extinct, but is believed to be an ancestor of the modern Beagle and Bloodhound. It is uncertain whether it was a scenthound (bred for the quality of its nose), a sighthound (bred for the quality of sight and speed), or a dog used for digging out quarry, nor is it known what type of quarry it hunted, whether deer, fox, boar, etc.

== History ==
In medieval times, "Talbot" was a common name for an individual hound, as used before 1400 in Chaucer's "The Nun's Priest's Tale" (line 3383), and is used as an example of a hound name in George Turberville's 1575 work The Noble Art of Venerie or Huntyng.

By the 17th century it clearly existed as a breed or type. Large, heavy, slow hounds were "talbot-like", whatever their colour, though the "milk white" was "the true talbot". In his poem "The Chase", published in 1735, William Somervile describes the use of "lime-hounds" (leash hounds) on the Scottish Borders to catch thieves, obviously referring to the Bloodhound and the sleuth hound, but adds that the (white) Talbot was the "prime" example of this type of hound.

The origin of both the name and the animal is uncertain. In a quotation from about 1449, the king referred to John Talbot, 1st Earl of Shrewsbury as "Talbott, oure good dogge", perhaps as a play on his name, or in allusion to that family's heraldic badge. In a 1445 illuminated manuscript in the British Library John Talbot, 1st Earl of Shrewsbury is depicted presenting a Book of Romances to Queen Margaret of Anjou, with a short-legged and long-eared white hound standing behind him, which serves to identify him symbolically. It is very similar to a 15th-century depiction on a ceiling at Haddon Hall, Derbyshire, made following the marriage of Sir Henry Vernon (1445–1515) to Ann Talbot, daughter of John Talbot, 2nd Earl of Shrewsbury.

The Talbot and the Greyhound were, apparently, the only hounds used in English heraldry, and it could be that the Talbot originated as an emblematic or heraldic hound. References to this heraldic Talbot seem to be earlier than any references to a real dog. The Talbot appears in many coats of arms, for instance in later ones of the Earls of Shrewsbury, in which two Talbots appear as supporters.

It is quite plausible that from these beginnings the name "Talbot" was extended to any large, heavy, white scent hound, and from there helped to establish a breed or type. It was certainly similar to the Bloodhound ("white" is given as one of the colours of the Bloodhound in the 16th and 17th centuries) as regards size, and as regards use to a leash-hound.

As earliest references to this dog are much later than those to Bloodhounds, it cannot convincingly be regarded as an ancestor of the Bloodhound.

The Talbot seems to have existed as a breed, a little distinct from the Bloodhound, until the end of the 18th century, after which, like two other large breeds to which it may have been related, the Northern Hound and the Southern Hound, it disappeared. Some early dog-shows apparently offered classes for Talbots, but attracted no entrants, so they were dropped.

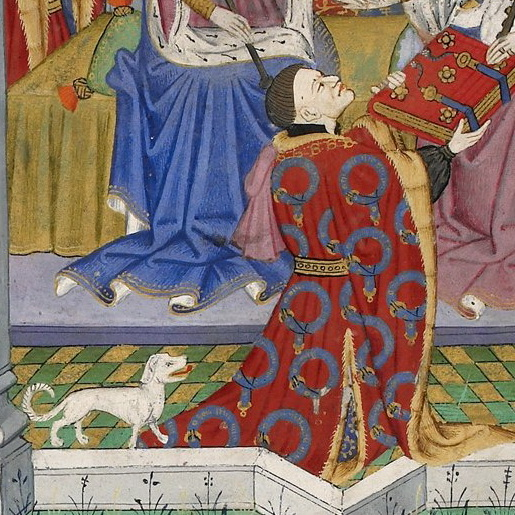
A Talbot Hound depicted in 1445 behind John Talbot, 1st Earl of Shrewsbury, presenting a book to Margaret of Anjou, Queen of England (illuminated miniature, Talbot Shrewsbury Book, British Library, Royal 15 E VI f. 2v)

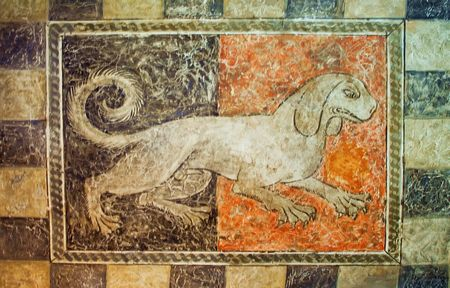
15th c. depiction of a Talbot Hound at Haddon Hall, Derbyshire, made following the marriage of Sir Henry Vernon (1445-1515) to Ann Talbot, daughter of John Talbot, 2nd Earl of Shrewsbury

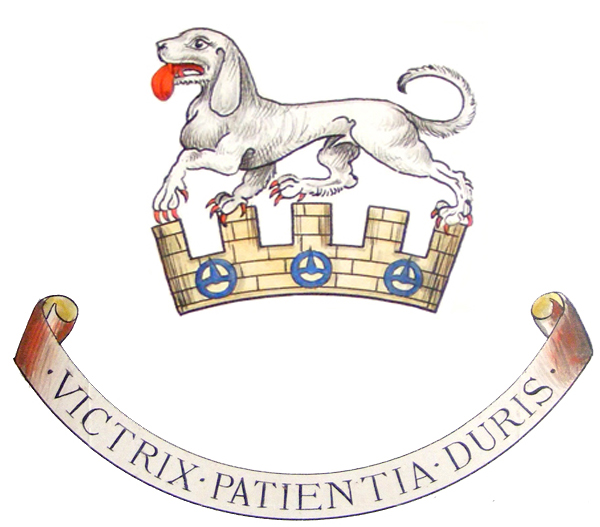
Crest of Carter of Castle Martin: a Talbot standing on a mural crown, 1891 artist's impression

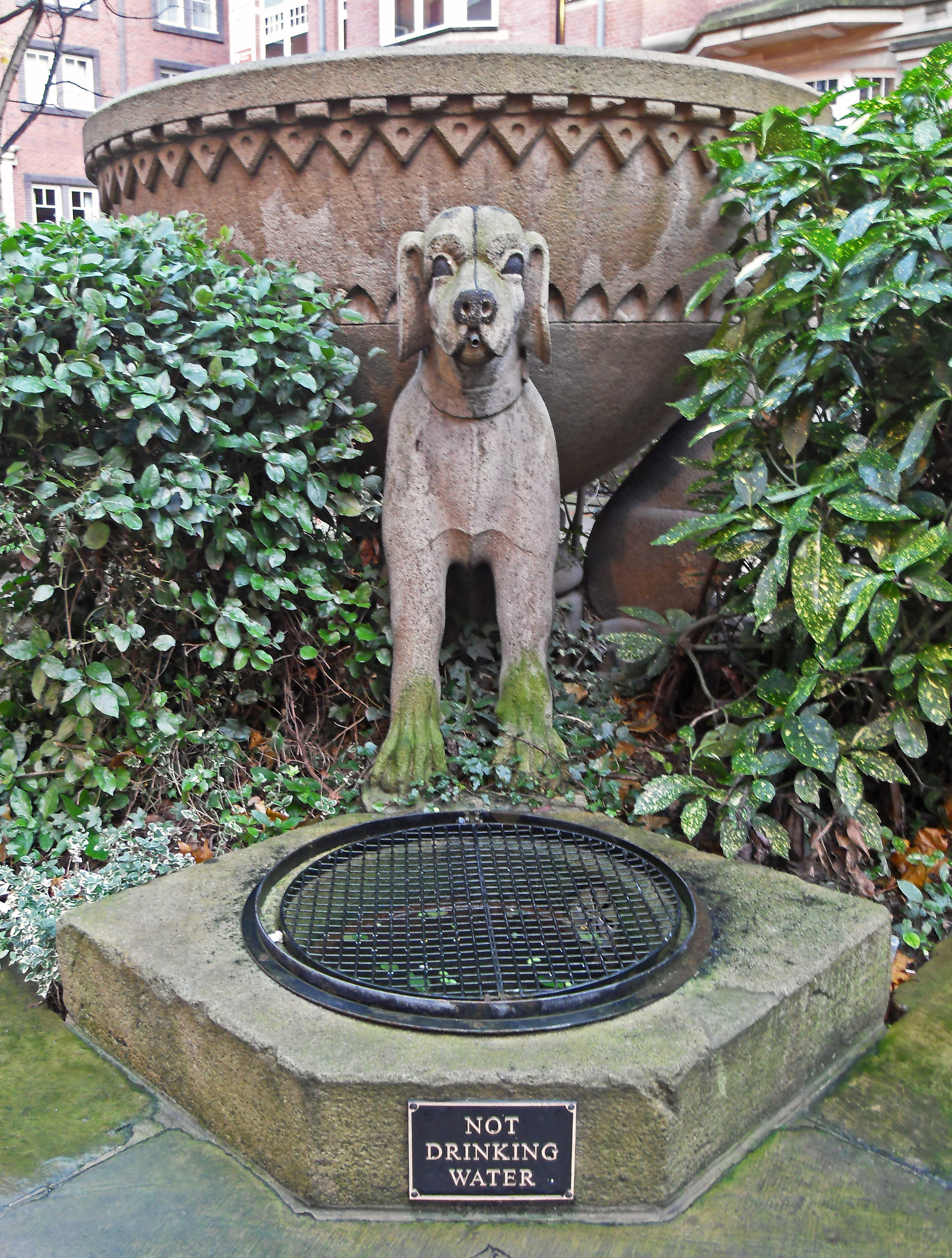
Talbot Hounds Fountain in Trevelyan Square, Leeds, a modern imaginary image of the Talbot

== Cultural legacy ==
=== Heraldry ===
In heraldic blazonry, the Talbot is occasionally encountered representing a distinct variety of hound.

==== Arms of Sudbury, Suffolk ====
The mayor and corporation of the market town of Sudbury, Suffolk, has for arms: Sable, a talbot hound sejeant argent on a chief gules a lion passant guardant between two fleurs-de-lys or (a white hound sitting erect). The crest is A talbot head and neck erased. Such a hound is also used as a logo for a local school and for many local sports clubs. The dog is always depicted with its tongue protruding. This refers to Simon de Sudbury (c.1316–1381), Archbishop of Canterbury and Lord Chancellor of England, born in the town, whose coat of arms was A talbot hound sejeant within a bordure engrailed, as is visible sculpted in stone on a wall in the nave of the Canterbury Cathedral.

==== Other ====
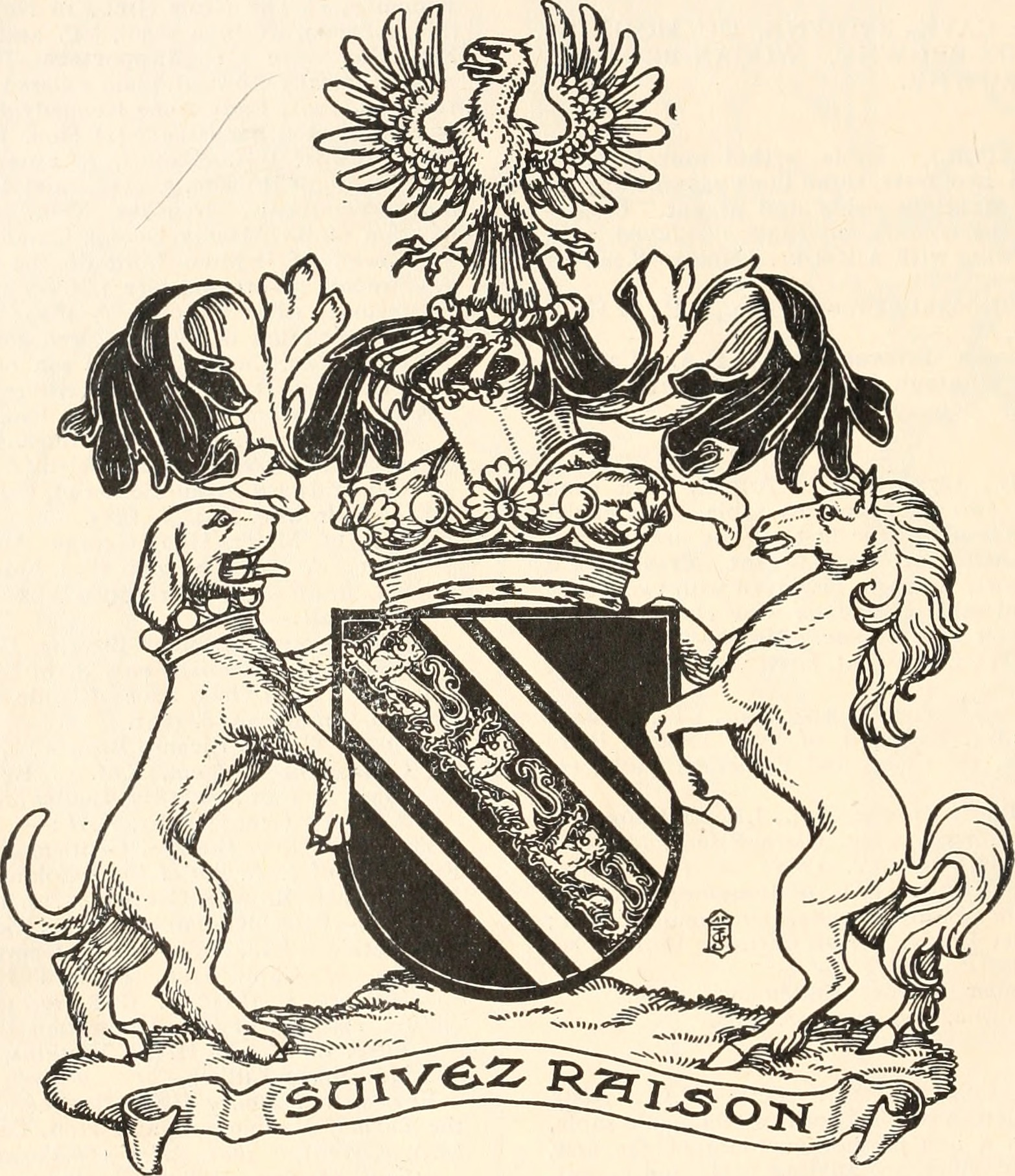
Arms of the Marquess of Sligo; the Talbot is the dexter supporter, on the left side of the image

The arms of the Carter family of Castle Martin (see Carter-Campbell of Possil) include a Talbot. The arms of the Earls Waldegrave have supporters of two Talbots. The Talbot Hound was also the symbol of Weston Road High School in the county town of Stafford, Staffordshire. It used to be used in all school stationery and was displayed as white on a navy blue background on ties and jumpers in the school uniform. It was removed when Weston Road became an academy. The Talbot also appears as a supporter in the arms of the Marquess of Sligo. The Earl of Talbot and Shrewsbury coat of arms was used on Talbot cars manufactured at a purpose-built factory at Barlby Road, Kensington, London and sold as Talbots until 1937. It is now used on the logo of the Talbot Owners' Club.

The arms of Bournemouth University have three Talbots on the shield, a reference to there being a University Campus on Talbot Heath.

The arms of Lady Margaret Hall, Oxford feature two talbots passant in reference to founder Edward Talbot (bishop).

=== Public house signs ===
"The Talbot" (or "Talbot Arms") is most familiar as a name of English public houses or inns and is usually depicted on the signs as a large white hound with hanging ears, sometimes with spots.

Heraldic inn signs usually displayed the arms or heraldic badges of the lord of the manor in which they were situated, who was probably the owner of the freehold interest, together with that of most other houses in the village. As the Talbot family possessed countless manors throughout England, the sign would have been well-known. Such signs helped to identify the inn for the illiterate. An inn called The Talbot in Iwerne Minster, Dorset, U.K., showed as its sign a black dog, apparently the crest of the Bower family, who owned the manor from the late Middle Ages till 1876. The "Talbot Inn" in Mells, Somerset is an allusion to the arms of the Horner family of Mells Manor: Sable, three talbots argent, the arms being possibly a play on the surname as hunting hounds are controlled by the blowing of horns.
