= Royal Academy Exhibition of 1872 =

1872 art exhibition in London

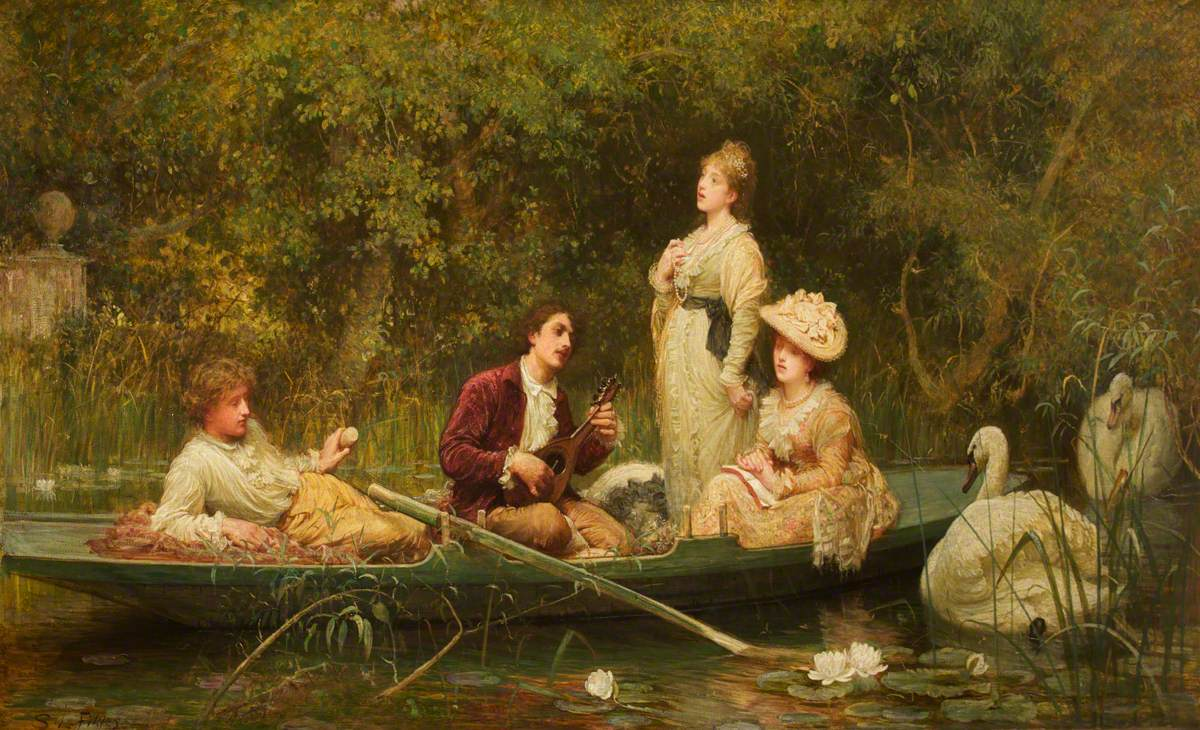
Fair Quiet and Sweet Rest by Luke Fildes

The Royal Academy Exhibition of 1872 was the 104th annual Summer Exhibition of the British Royal Academy of Arts held at Burlington House in London from 6 May to 5 August 1872. It was the largest held so far with 1,600 works from artists and architects of the Victorian era and attracted over 260,000 visitors. Francis Grant presided over the event as President of the Royal Academy.

The millionaire art collector Alfred Morrison acquired a number of works from the exhibition, including Frederic Leighton's Summer Moon and Henry William Banks Davis's A Panic. John Gilbert was criticised in The Times for the perceived poor quality of his history painting. King Charles I Leaving Westminster Hall. However, Luke Fildes enjoyed success with his debut submission Fair Quiet and Sweet Rest. William Powell Frith, one of the mainstays of the academy, sent in a number of paintings including At My Window, Boulogne and Henry VIII and Anne Boleyn Deer Shooting in Windsor Forest. Another veteran Edwin Landseer exhibited Lady Emily Peel with her Favourite Dogs, a work first commissioned in the 1840s.

John Everett Millais displayed the landscape painting Flowing to the Sea and its companion piece Flowing to the River as well as the group portrait Hearts are Trumps.

== Gallery ==
Whistler's Mother by James McNeill Whistler

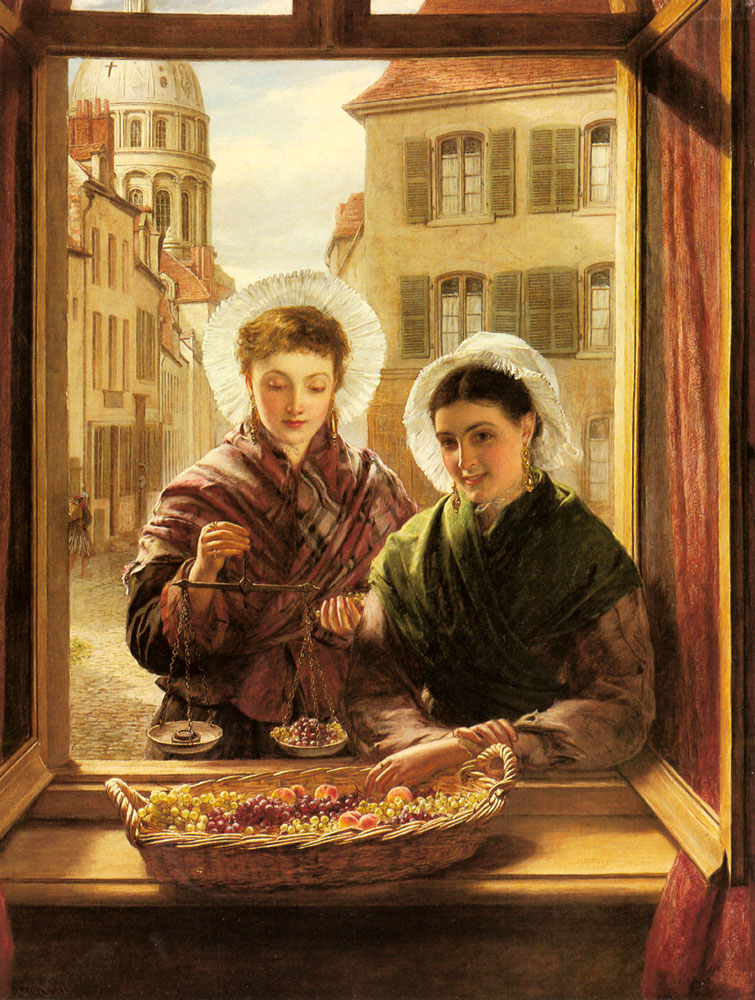
At My Window, Boulogne by William Powell Frith

Henry VIII and Anne Boleyn Deer Shooting in Windsor Forest by William Powell Frith

Lord Foppington Relating His Adventures by William Powell Frith

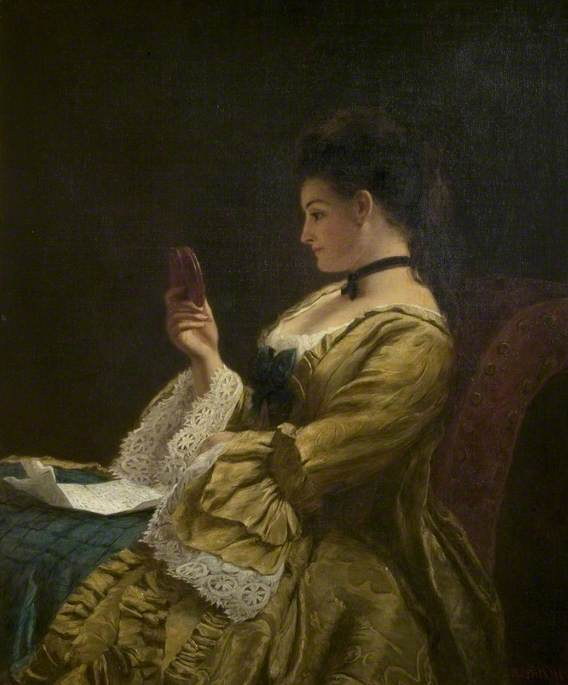
The Miniature by William Powell Frith

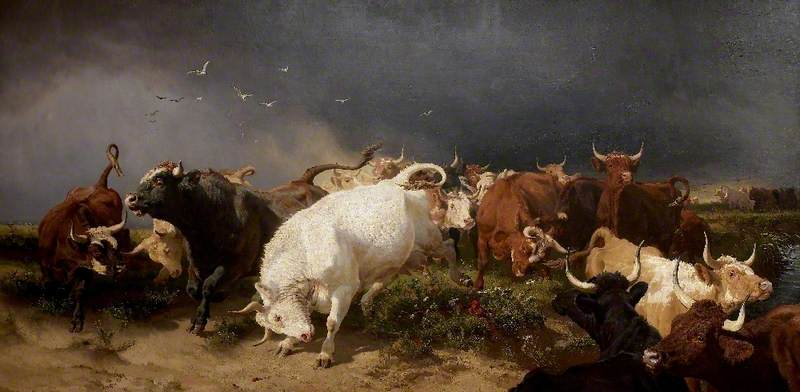
A Panic by Henry William Banks Davis

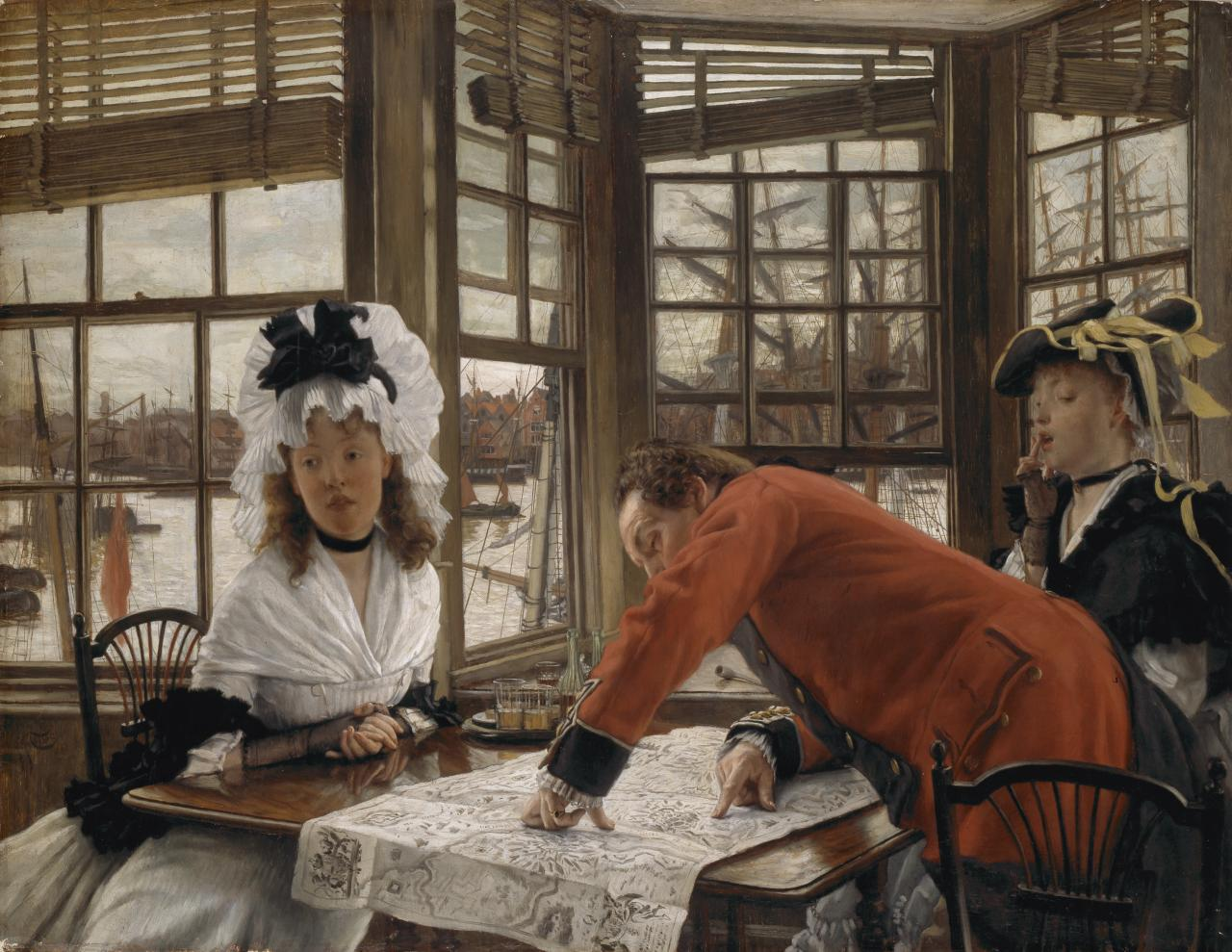
An Interesting Story by James Tissot

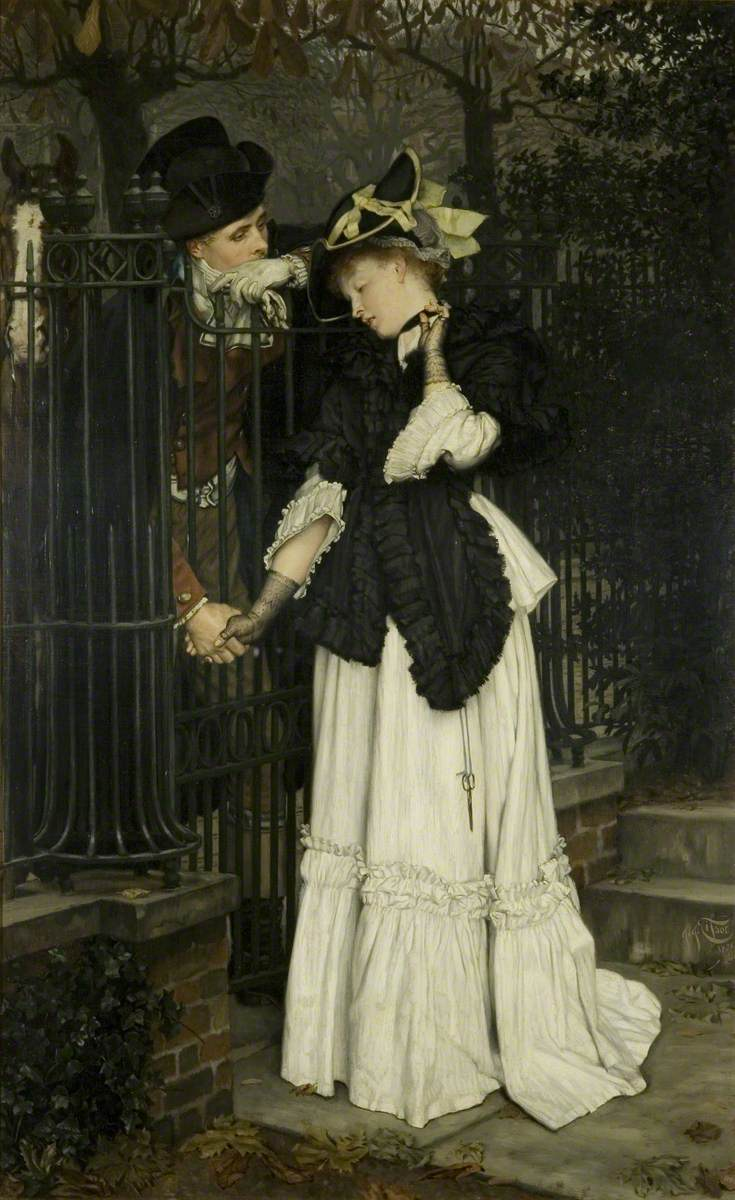
The Farewells by James Tissot

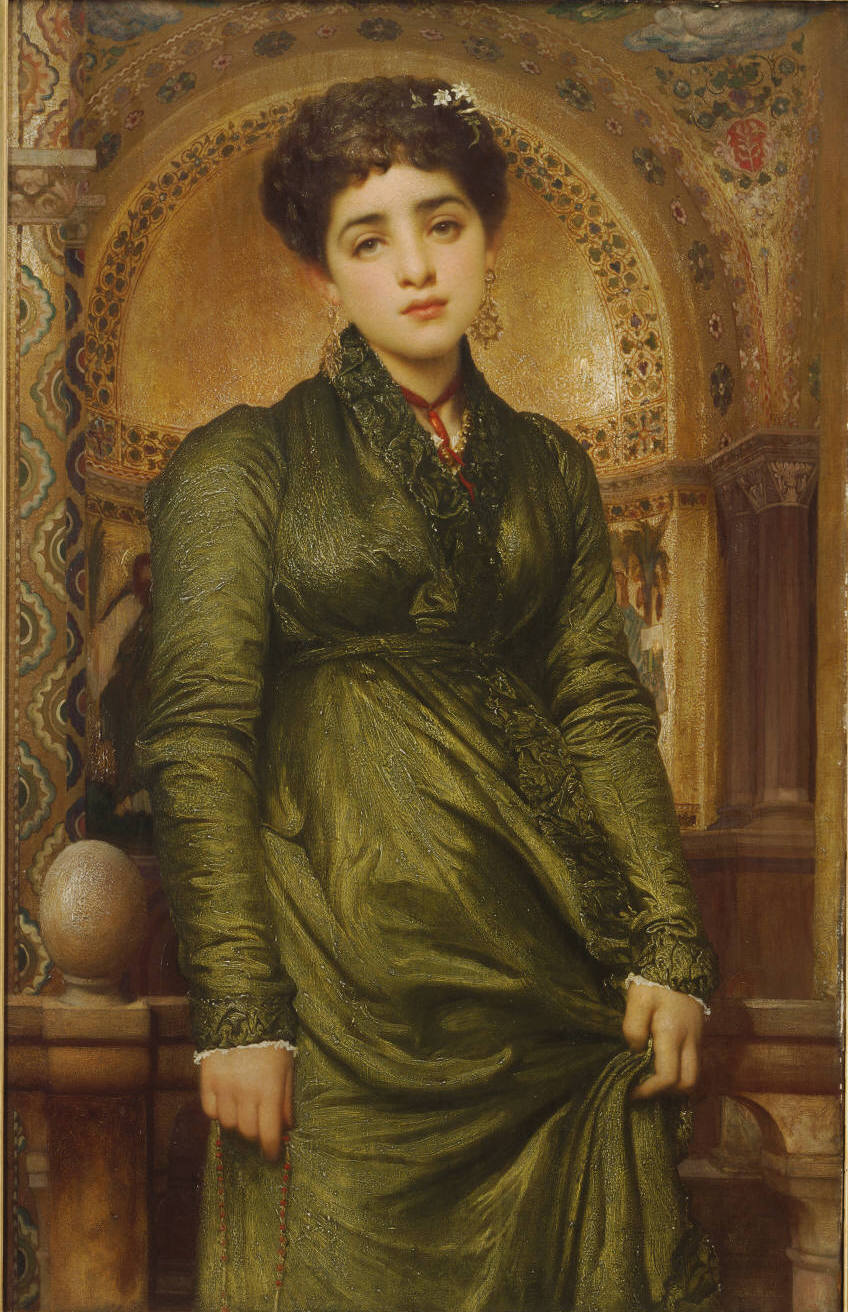
After Vespers by Frederic Leighton

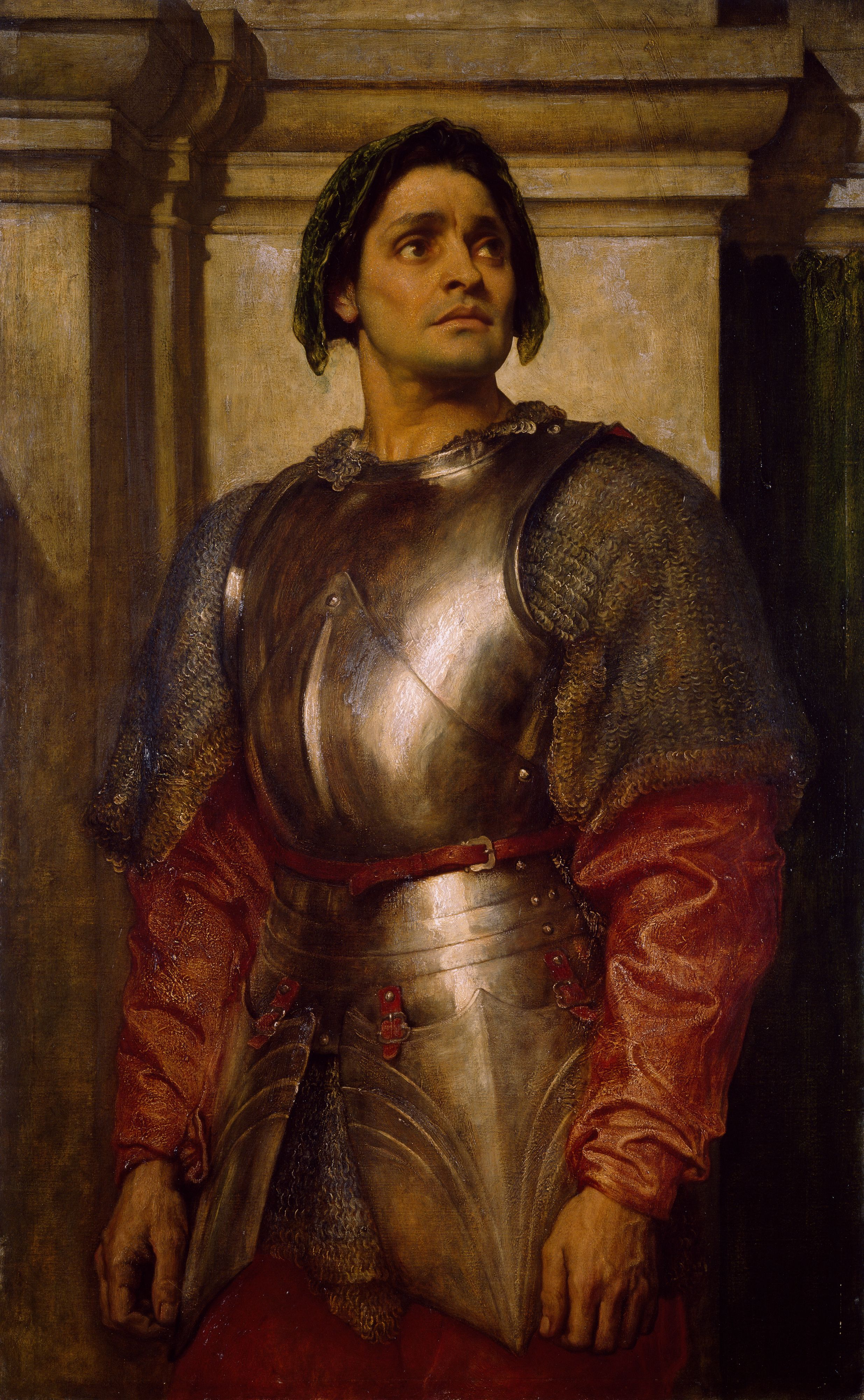
A Condottiere by Frederic Leighton

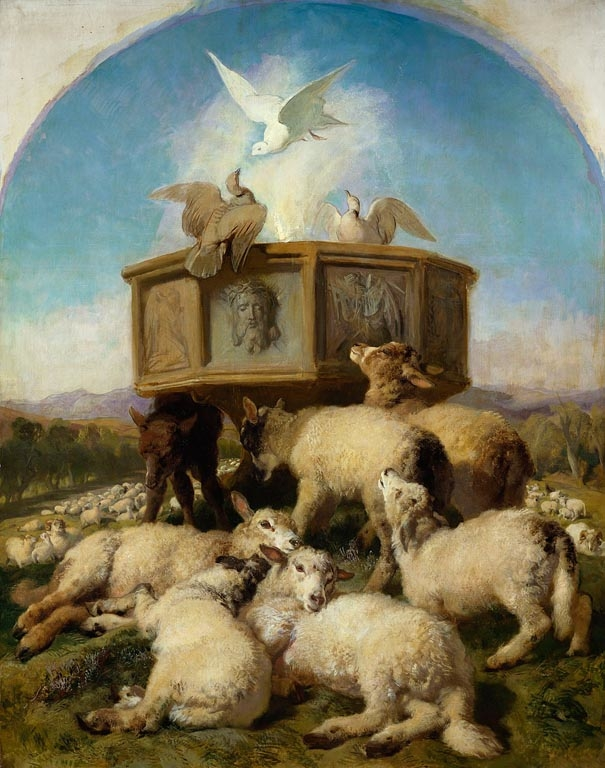
The Baptismal Font by Edwin Landseer

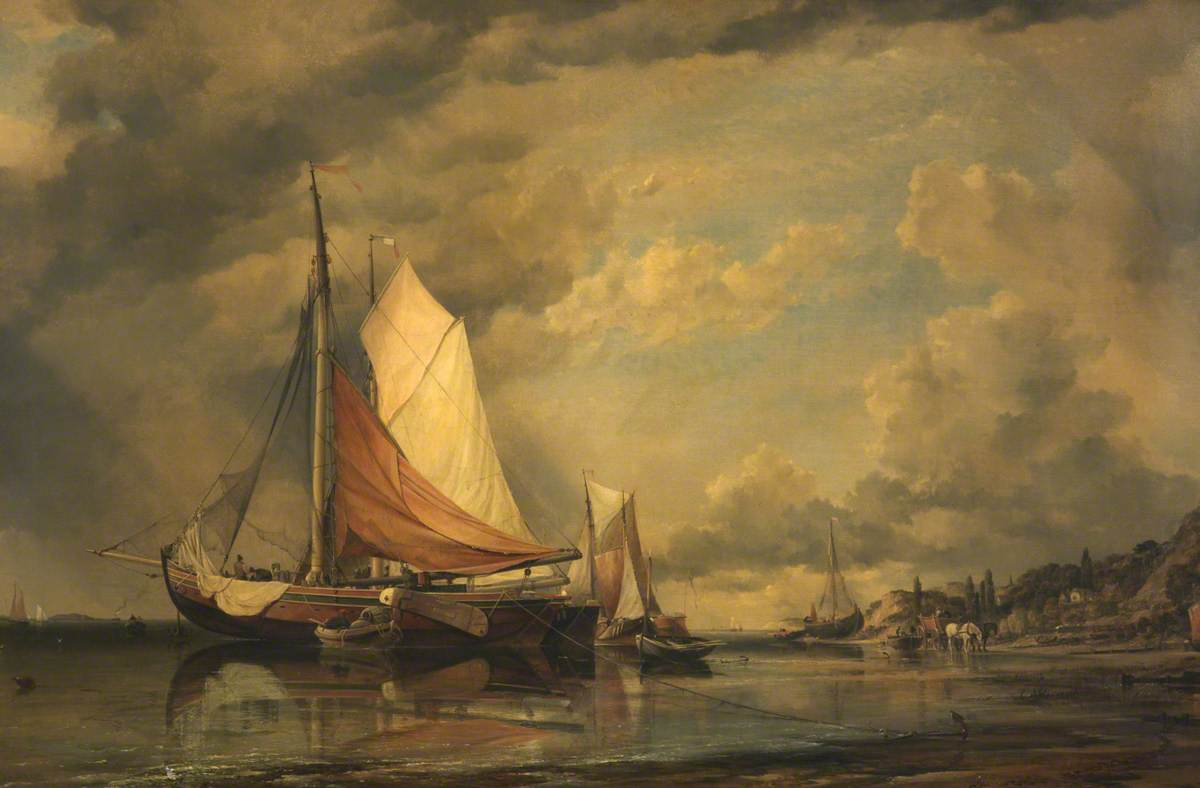
Danish Craft on the Elbe by Edward William Cooke

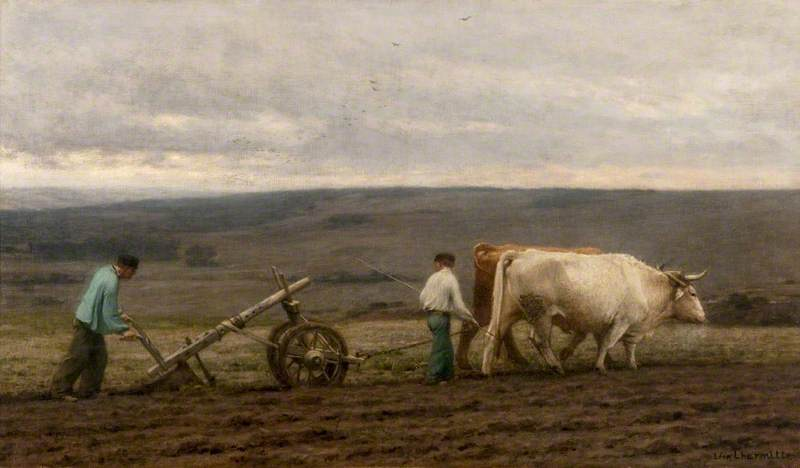
Ploughing with Oxen by Léon Lhermitte

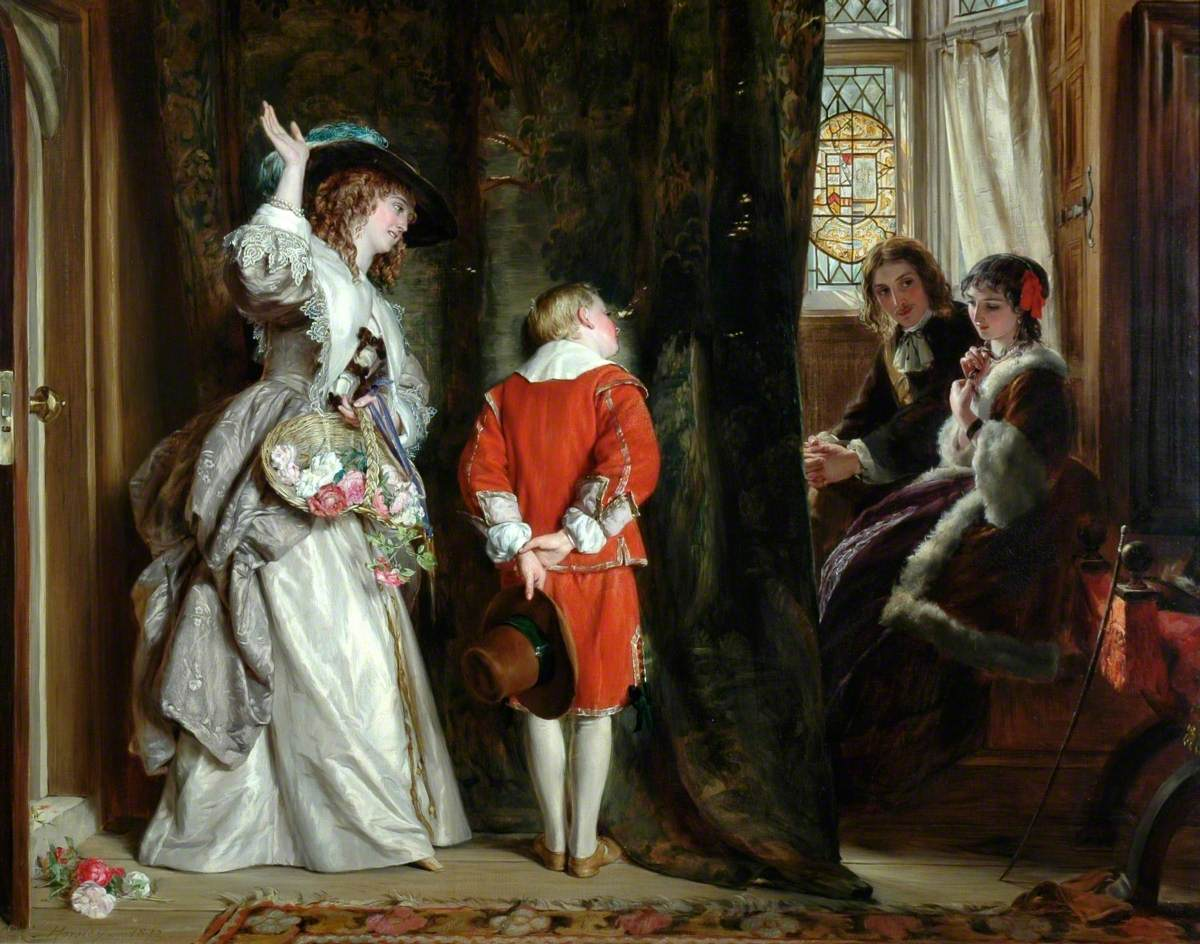
Pay for Peeping by John Callcott Horsley

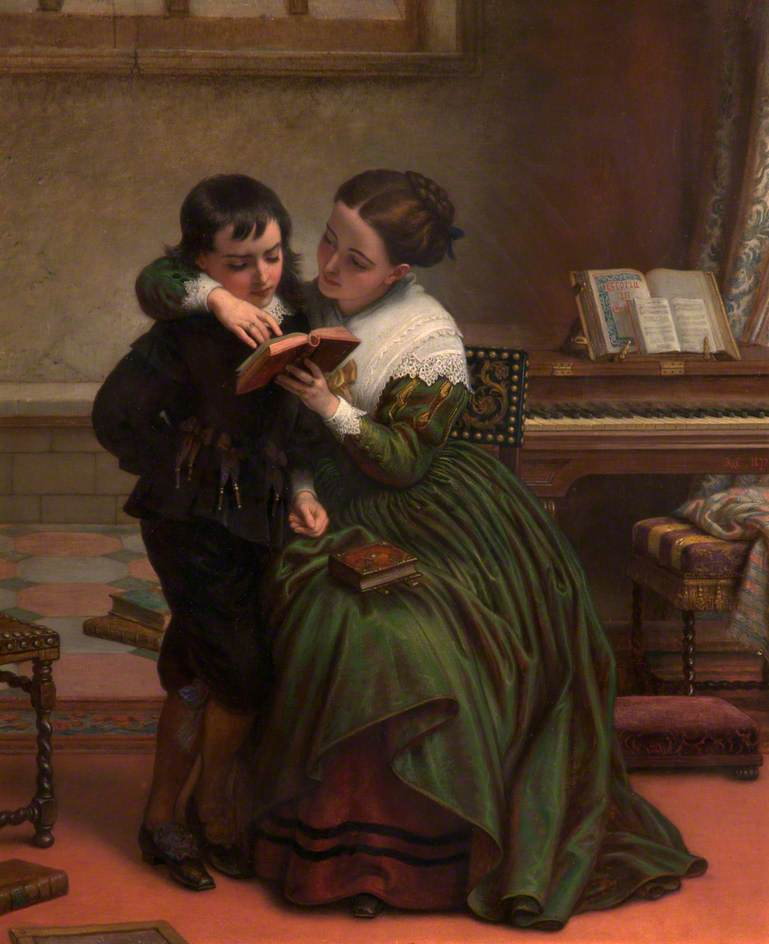
George Herbert and His Mother by Charles West Cope

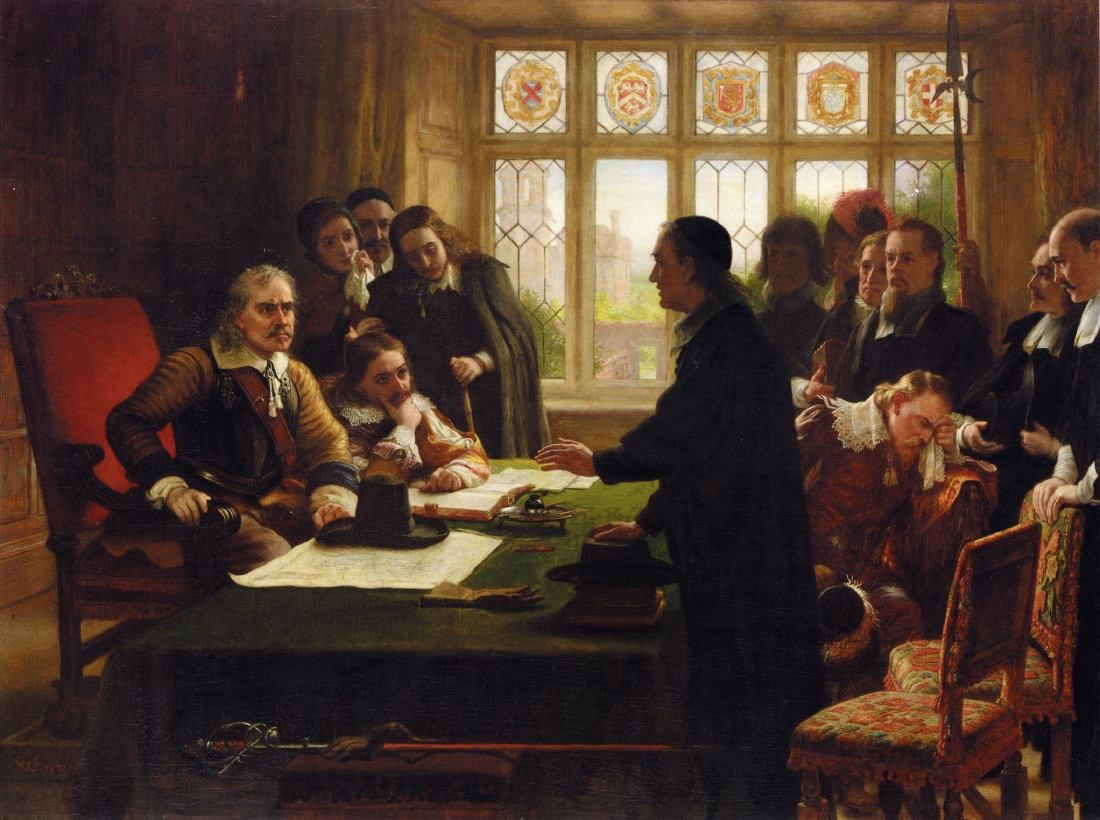
Oliver Cromwell and His Secretary John Milton, Receiving a Deputation Seeking Aid for the Swiss Protestants by Charles West Cope

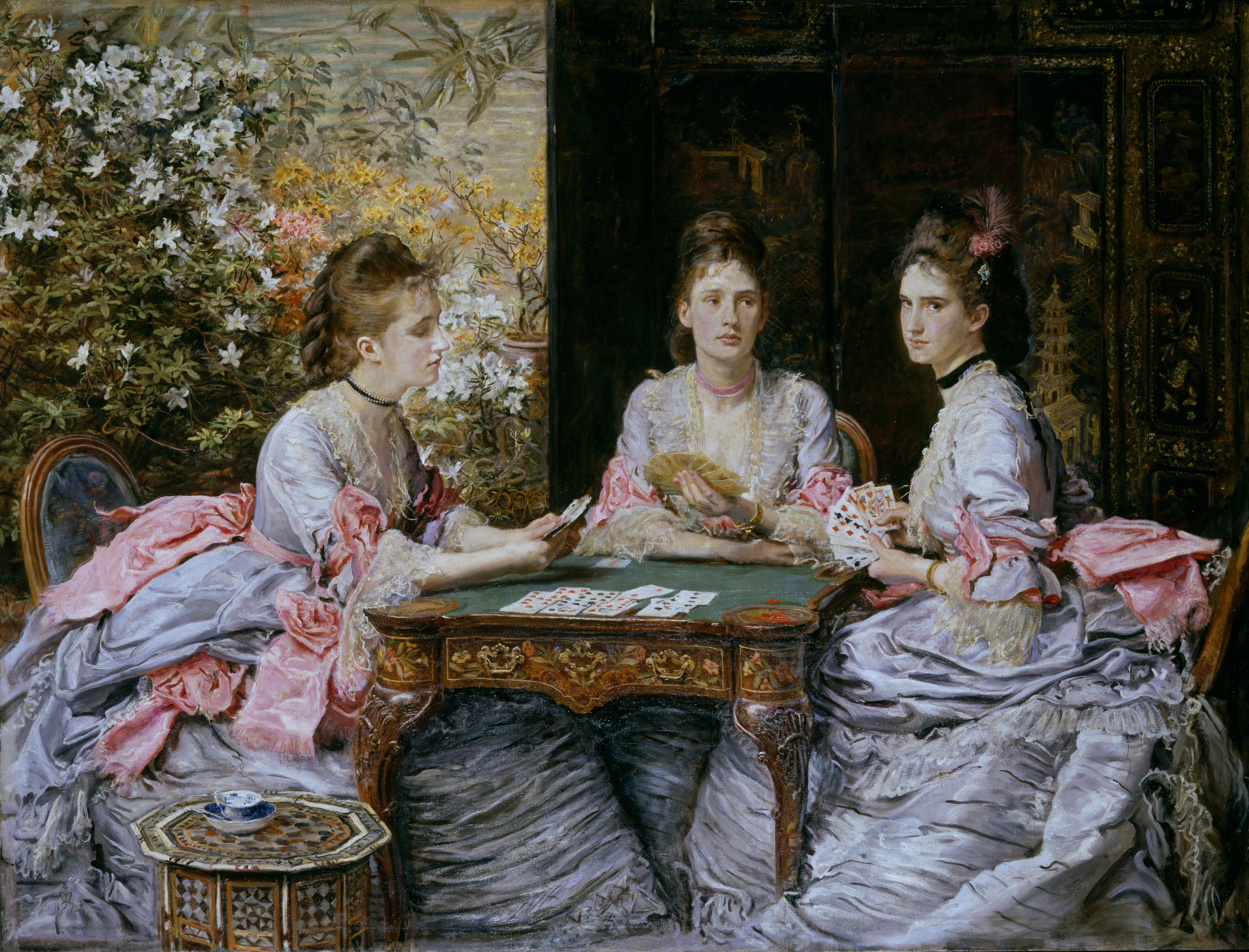
Hearts are Trumps by John Everett Millais

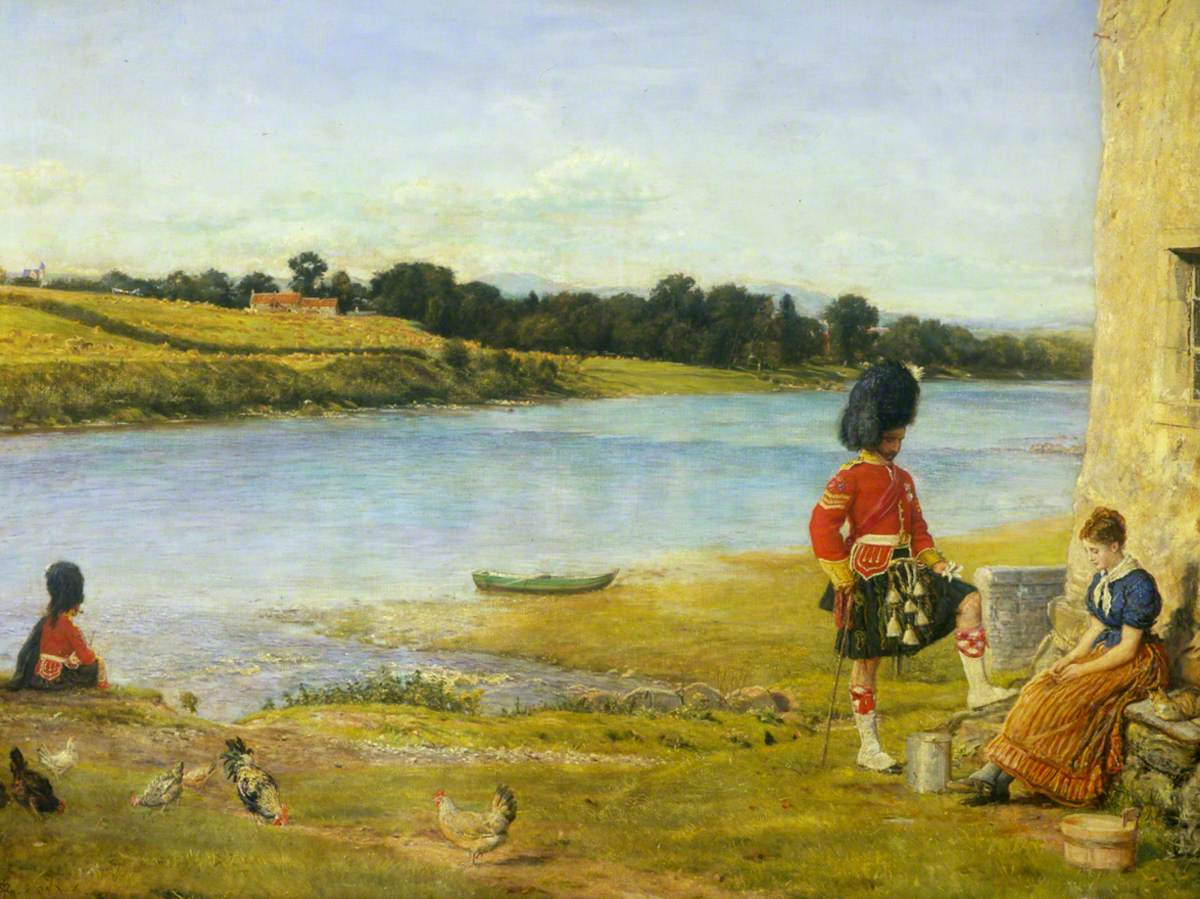
Flowing to the Sea by John Everett Millais

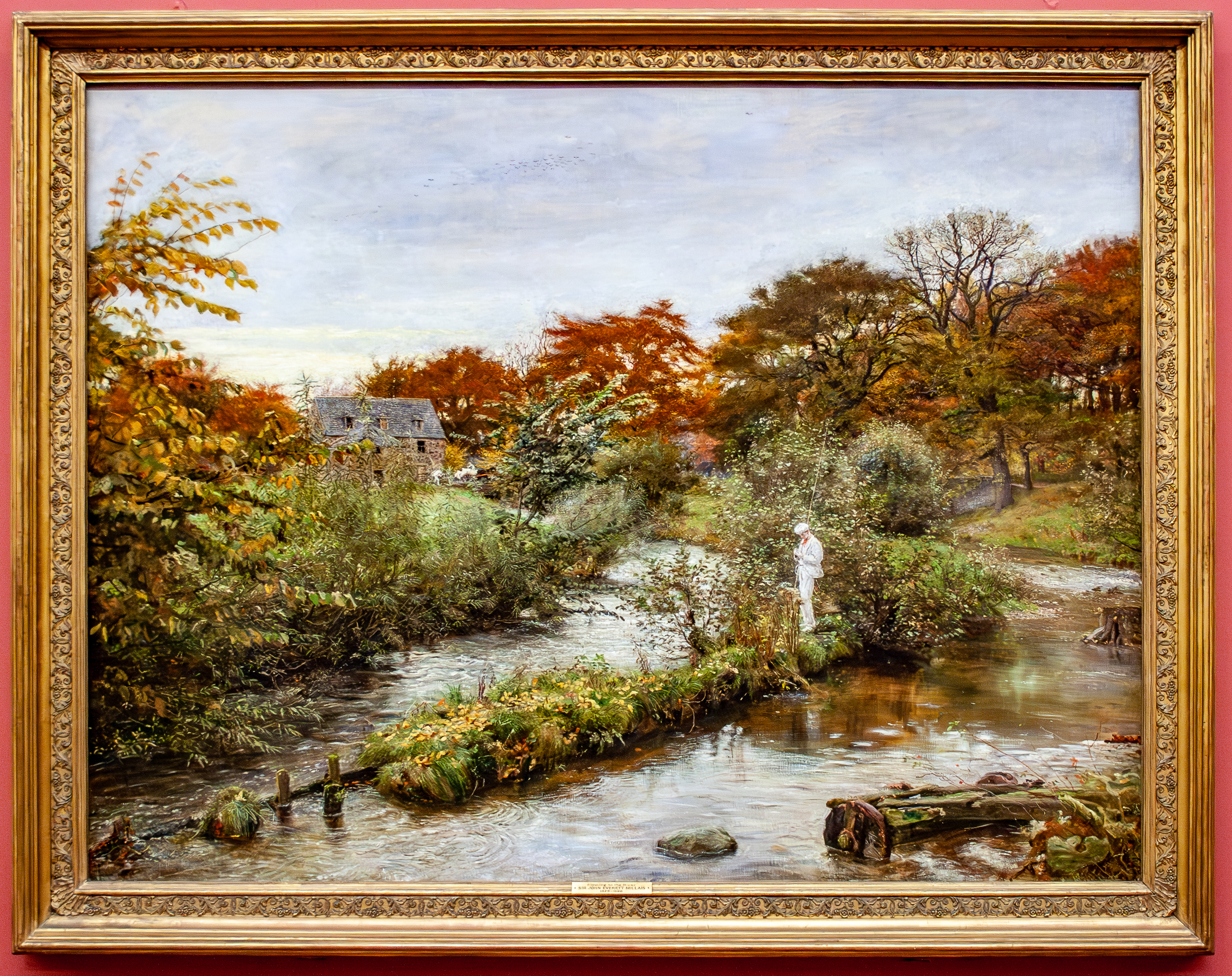
Flowing to the River by John Everett Millais

Charles I Leaving Westminster After His Death Sentence Had Been Passed by John Gilbert

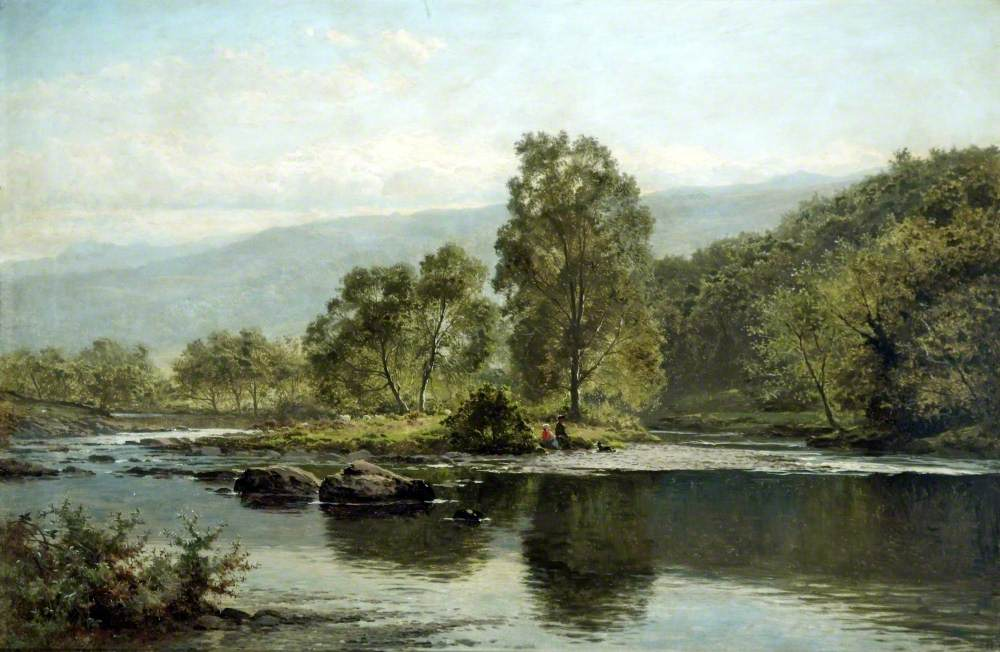
Near Capel Curig by Benjamin Williams Leader

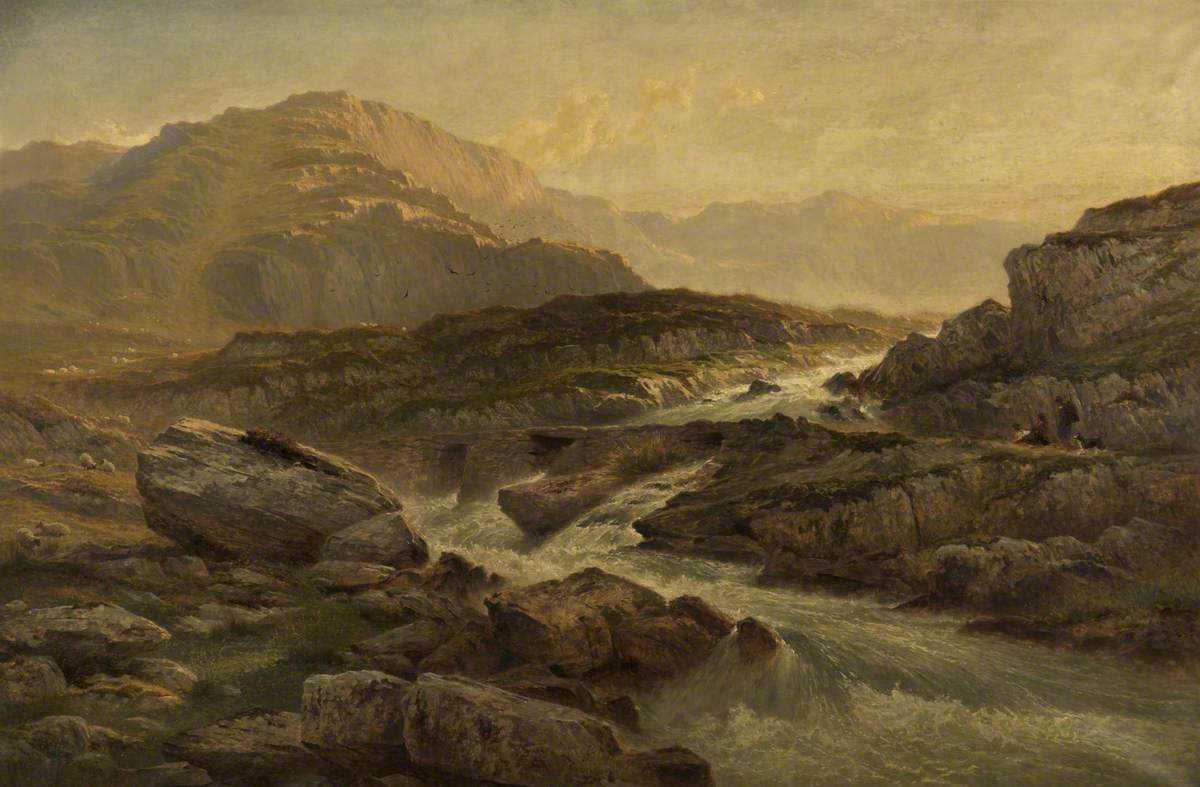
Wild Wales by Benjamin Williams Leader

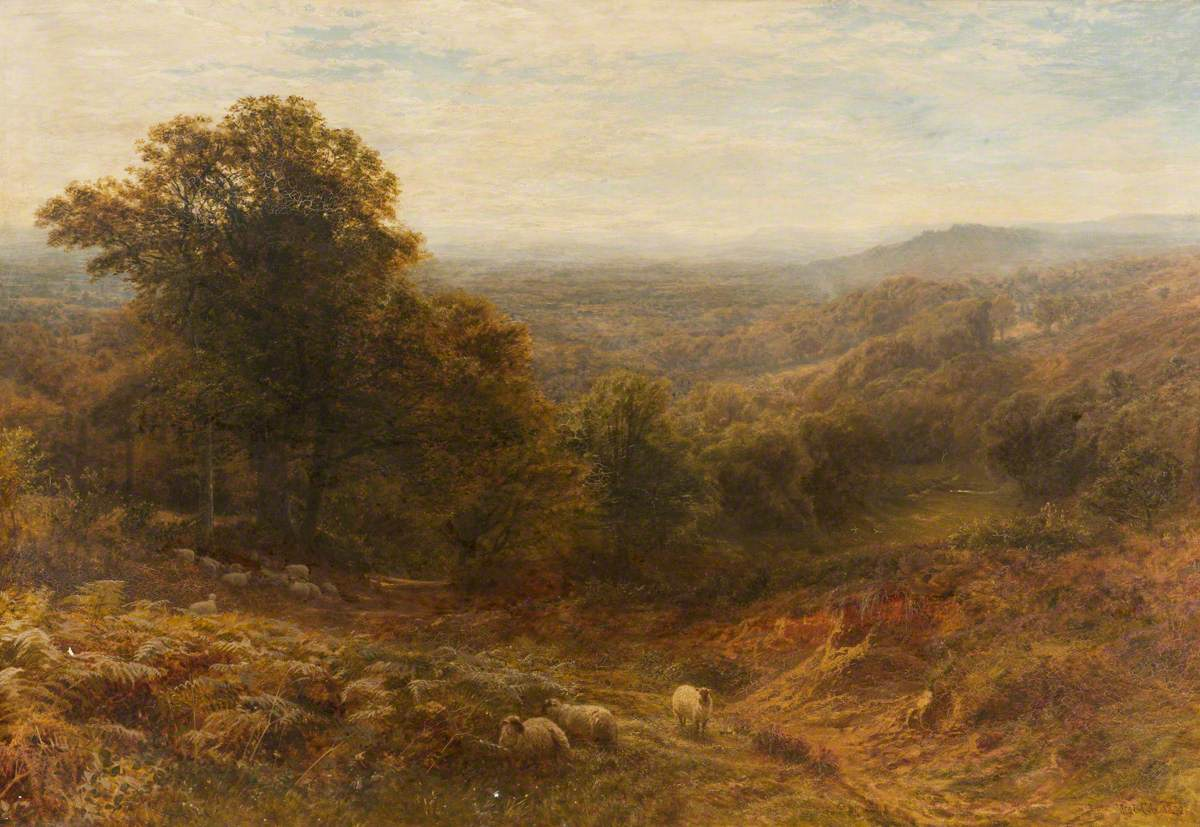
Noon on the Surrey Hills by George Vicat Cole

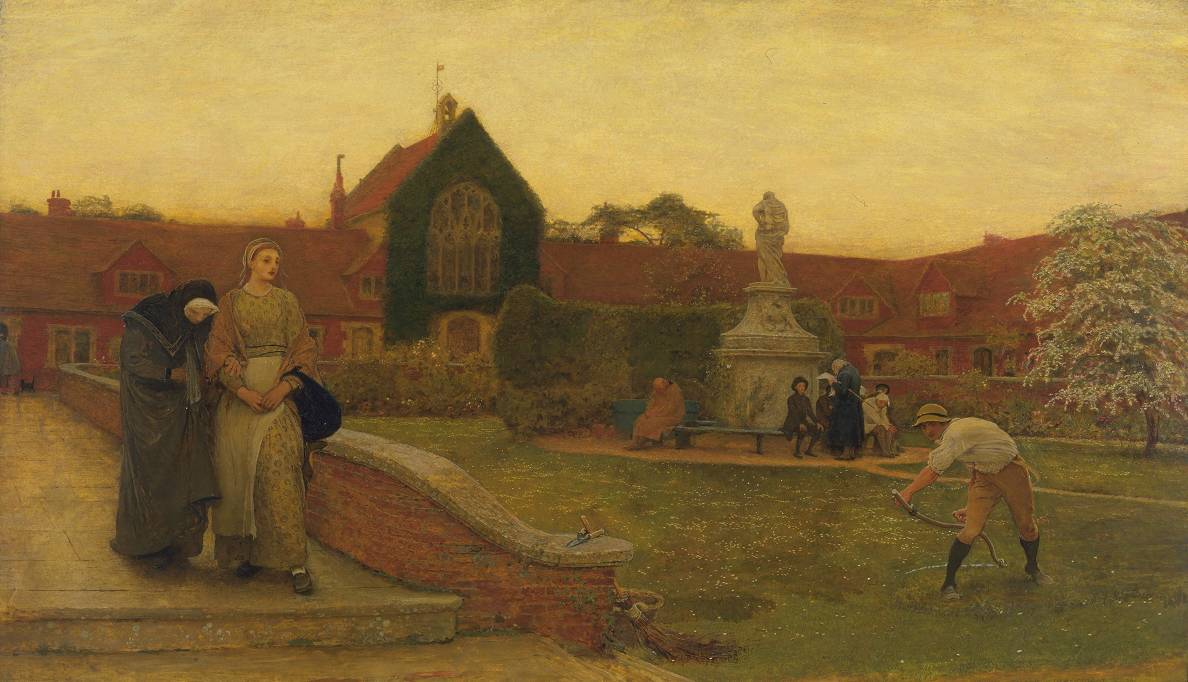
The Harbour of Refuge by Frederick Walker

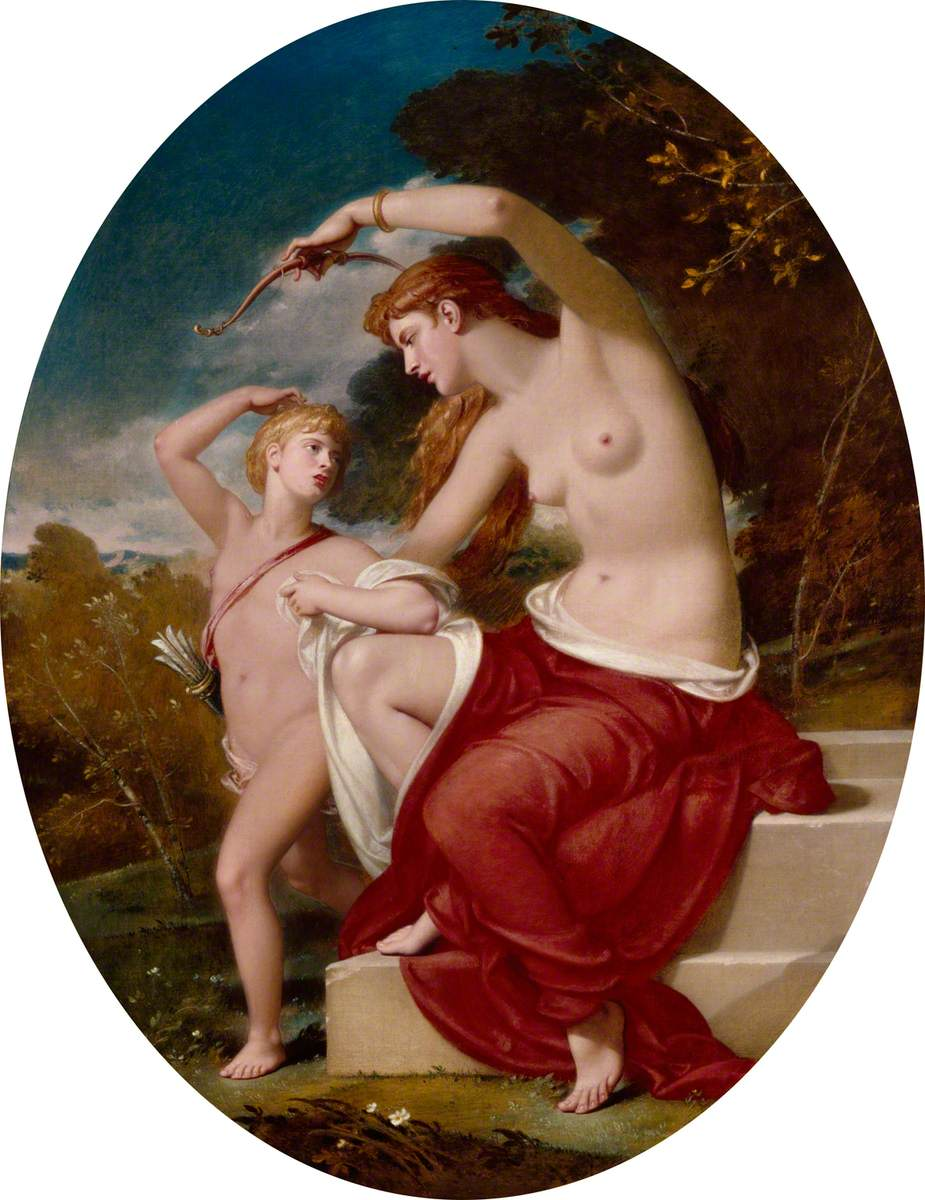
Nymph and Cupid by William Edward Frost

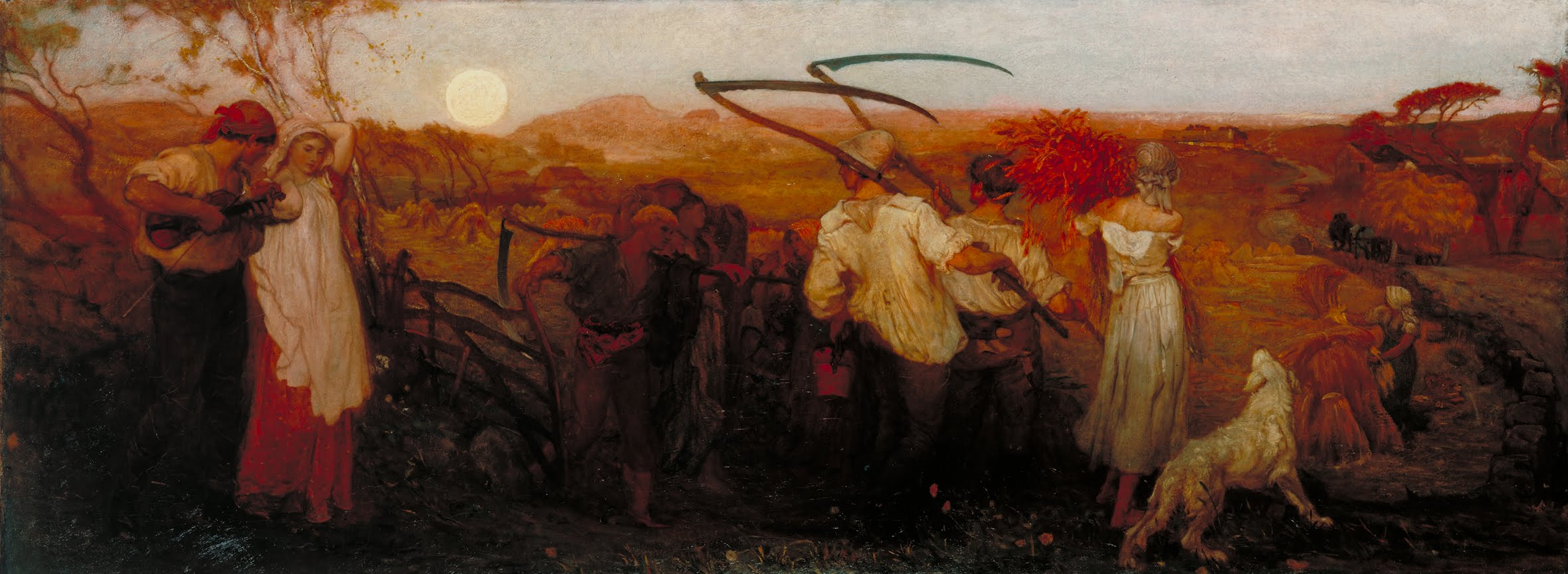
The Harvest Moon by George Mason

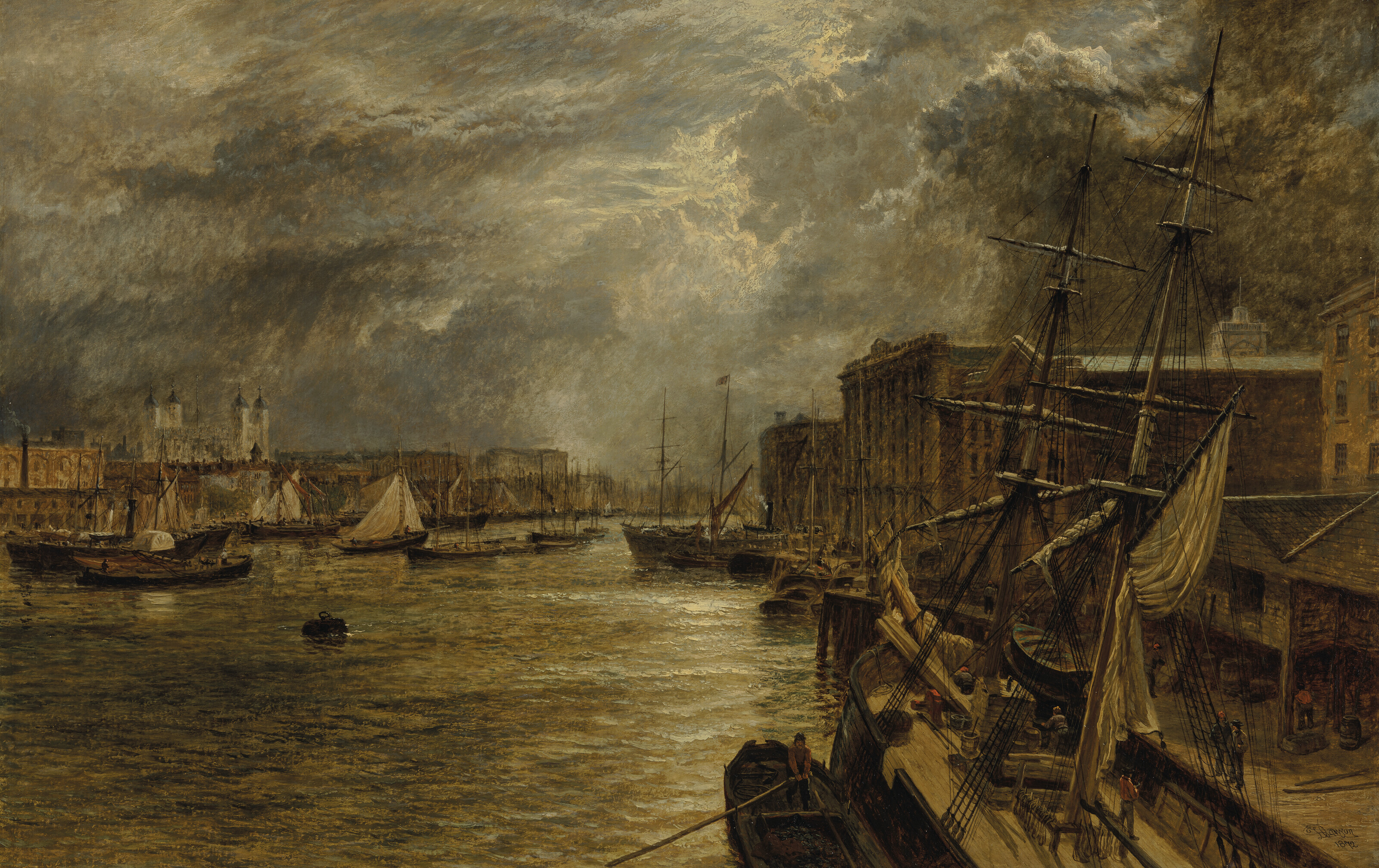
The Tower from London Bridge by Henry Dawson

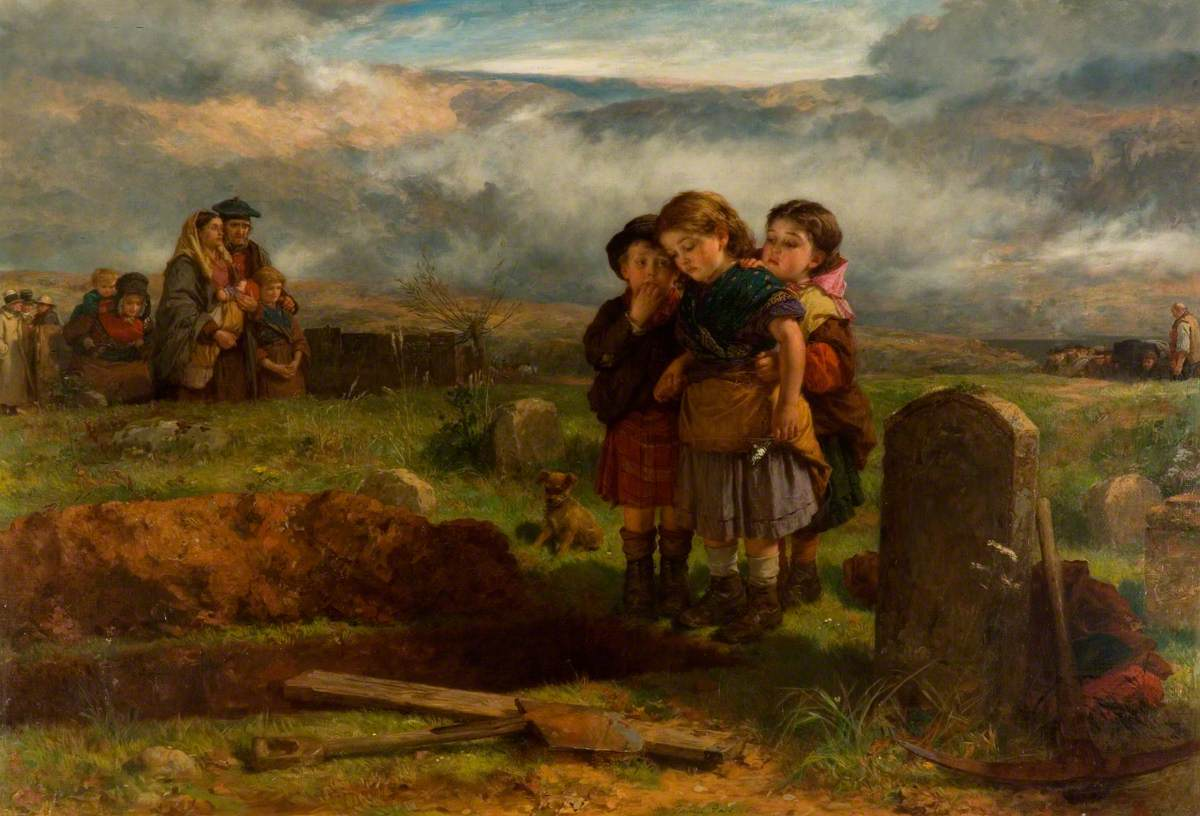
God's Acre by Thomas Faed

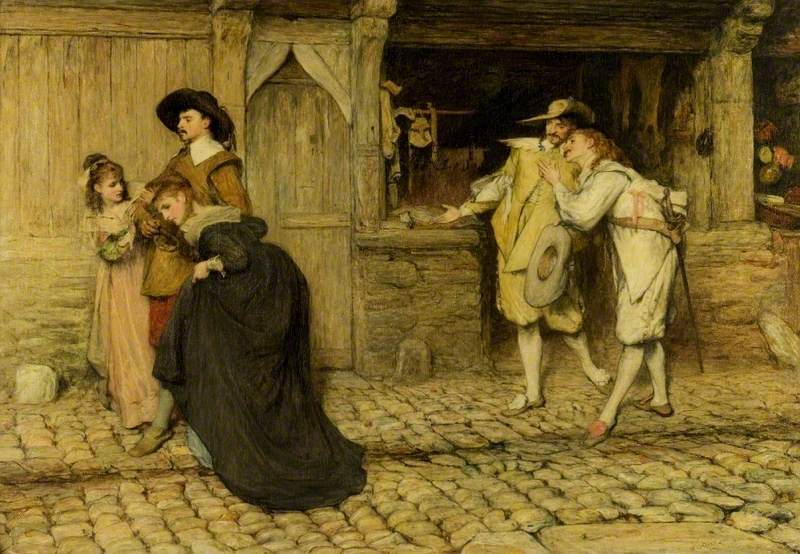
Casus Belli by William Quiller Orchardson

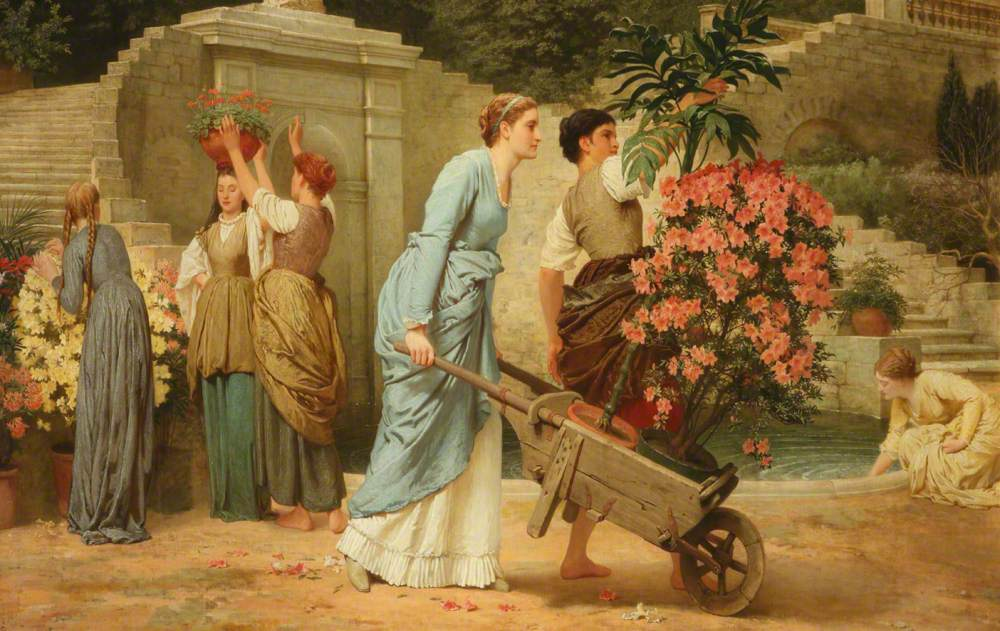
Playing at Work by Charles Edward Perugini

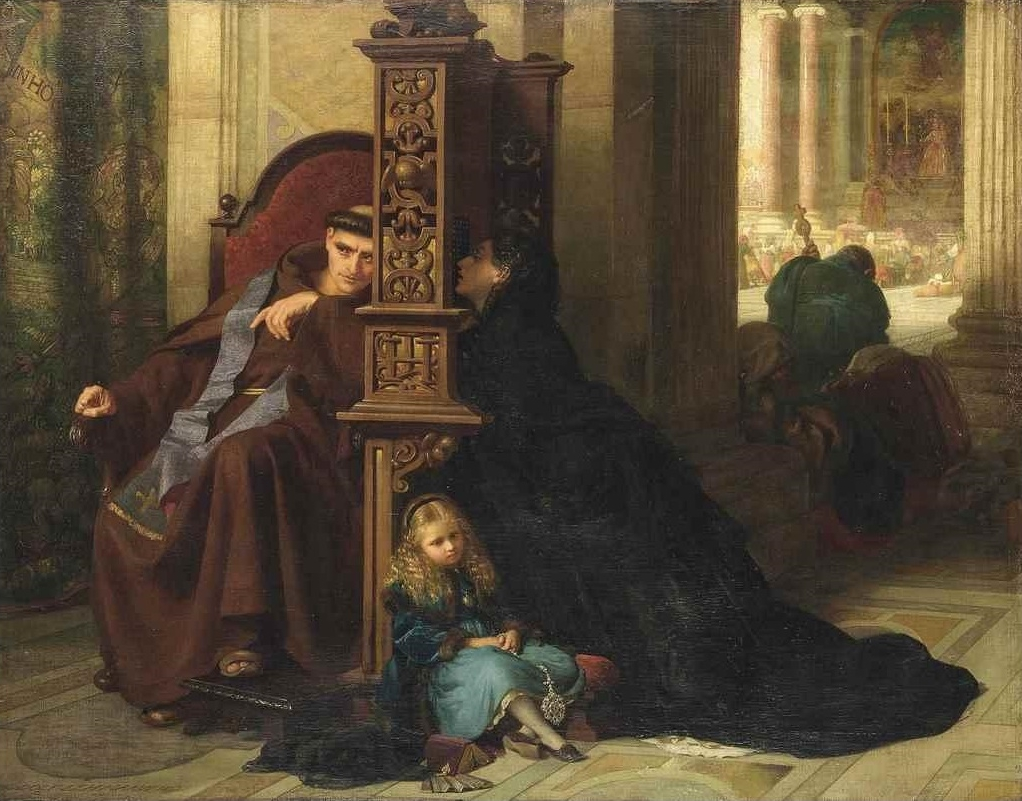
The Confessional by Henri Lehmann

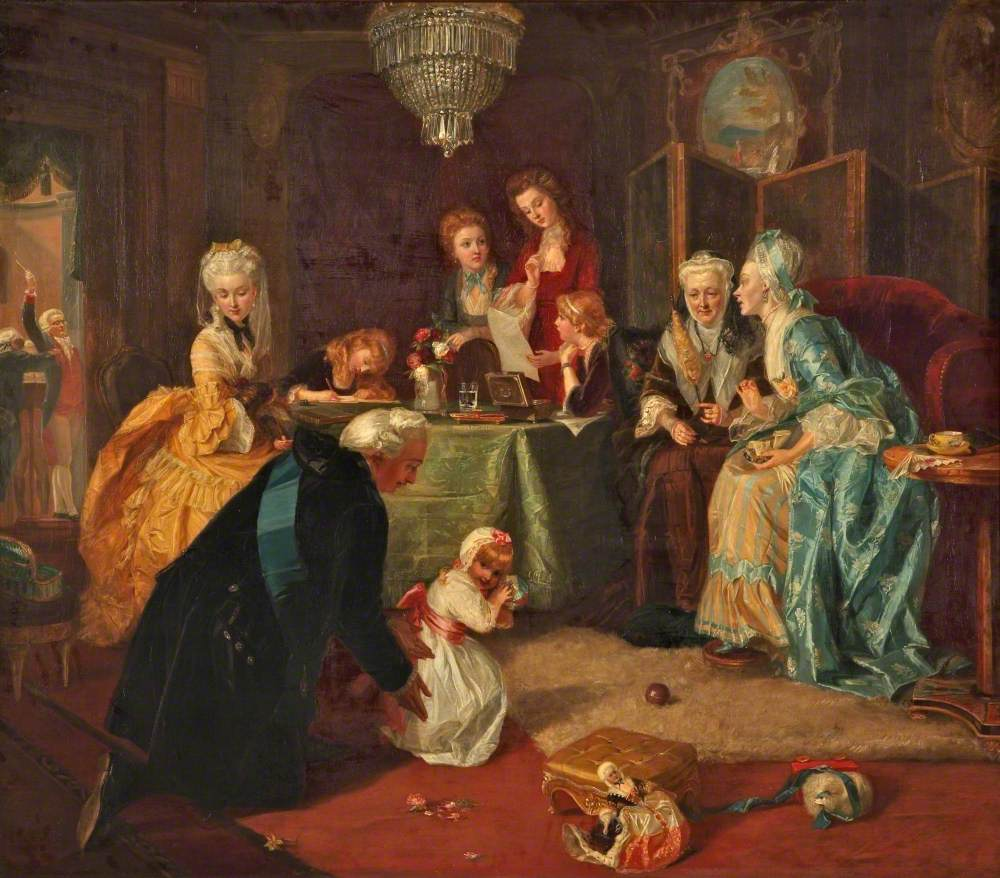
The Queens Lodge, Windsor in 1786 by Henrietta Ward

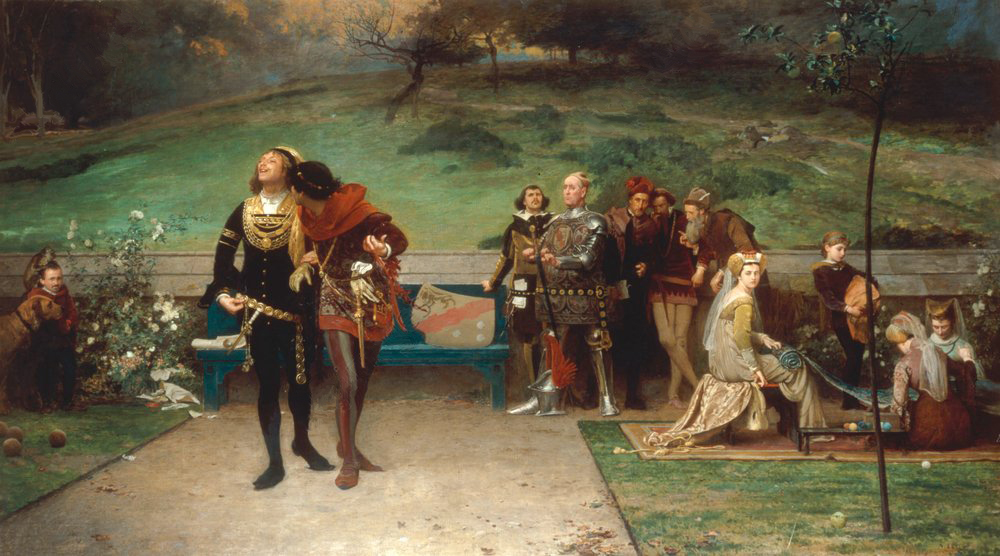
Edward II and Piers Gavestone by Marcus Stone

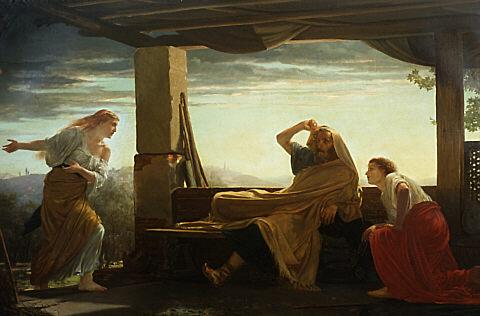
Dawn of the First Easter Sunday by Edward Armitage

The Return from Flight by Edward Matthew Ward

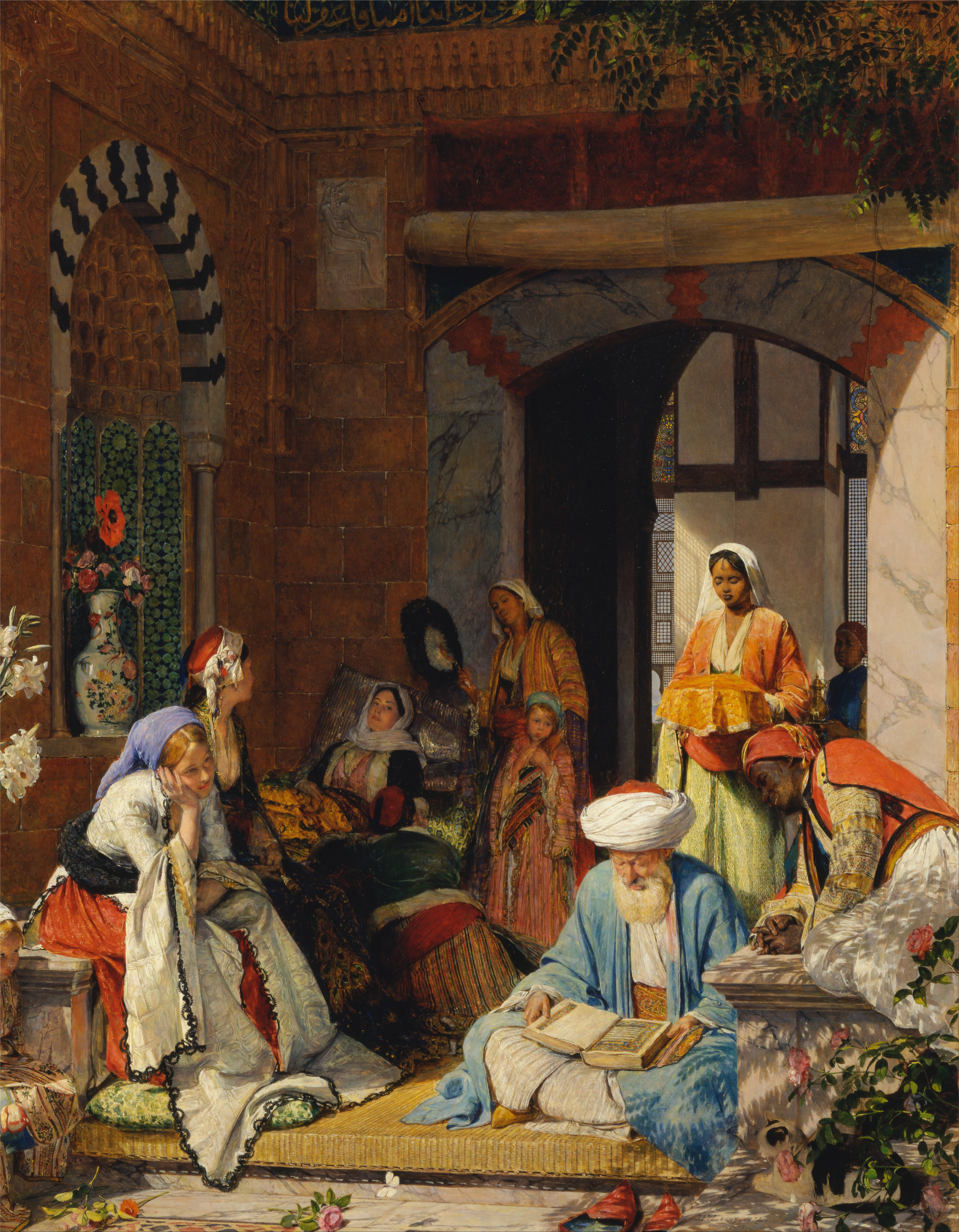
And the Prayer of Faith Shall Save the Sick by John Frederick Lewis

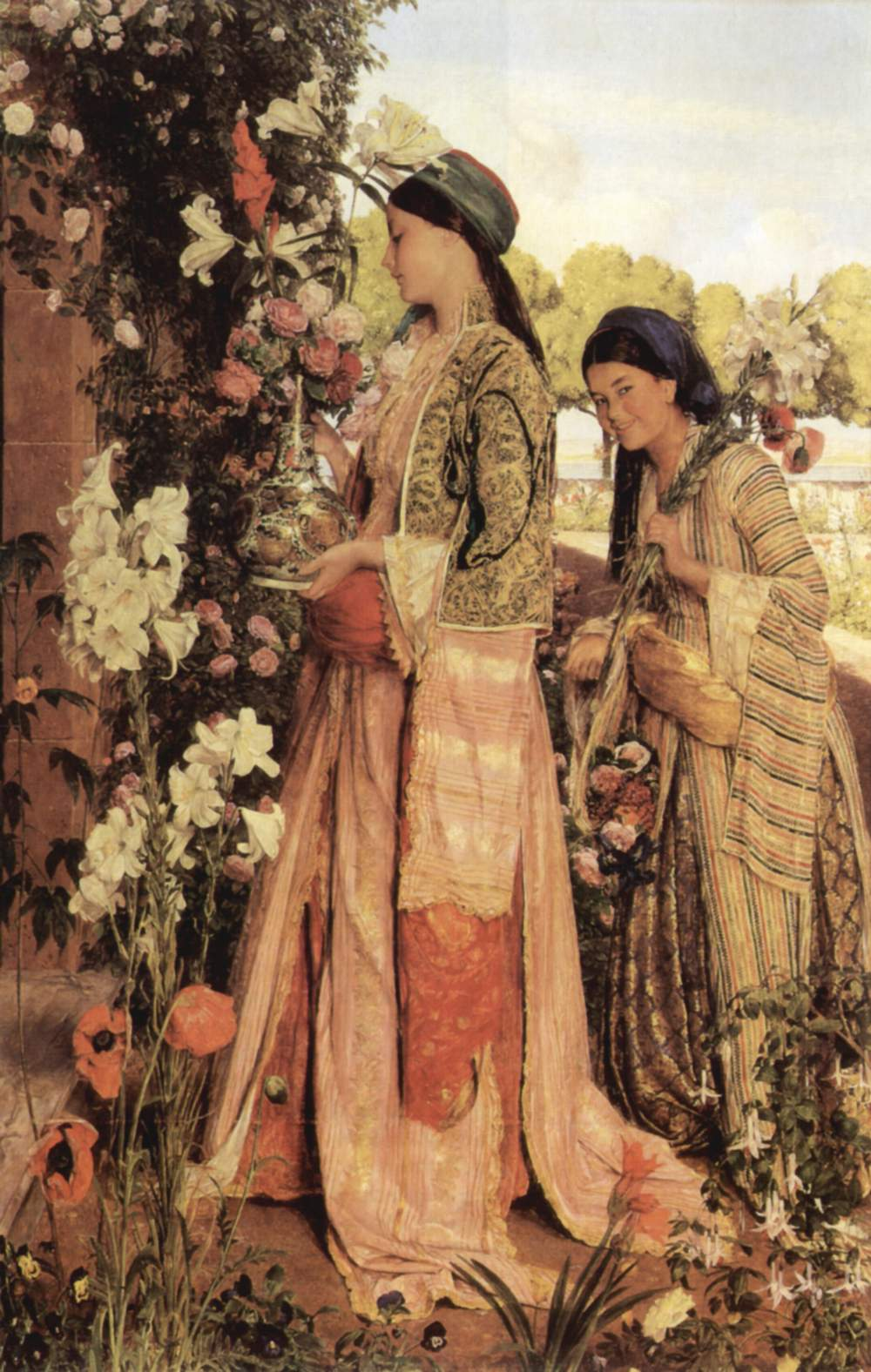
Lilium Auratum by John Frederick Lewis

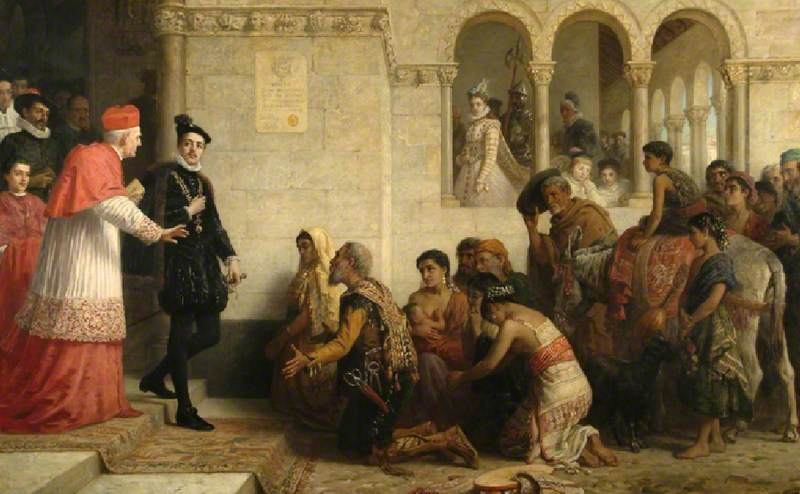
The Suppliants by Edwin Long

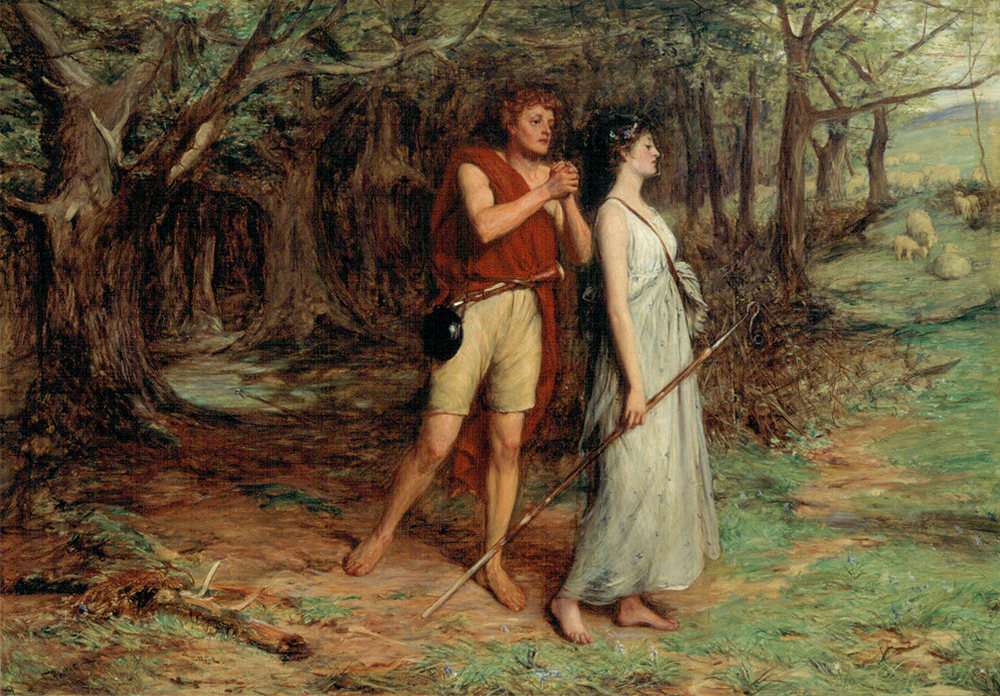
Silvius and Phoebe by John Pettie

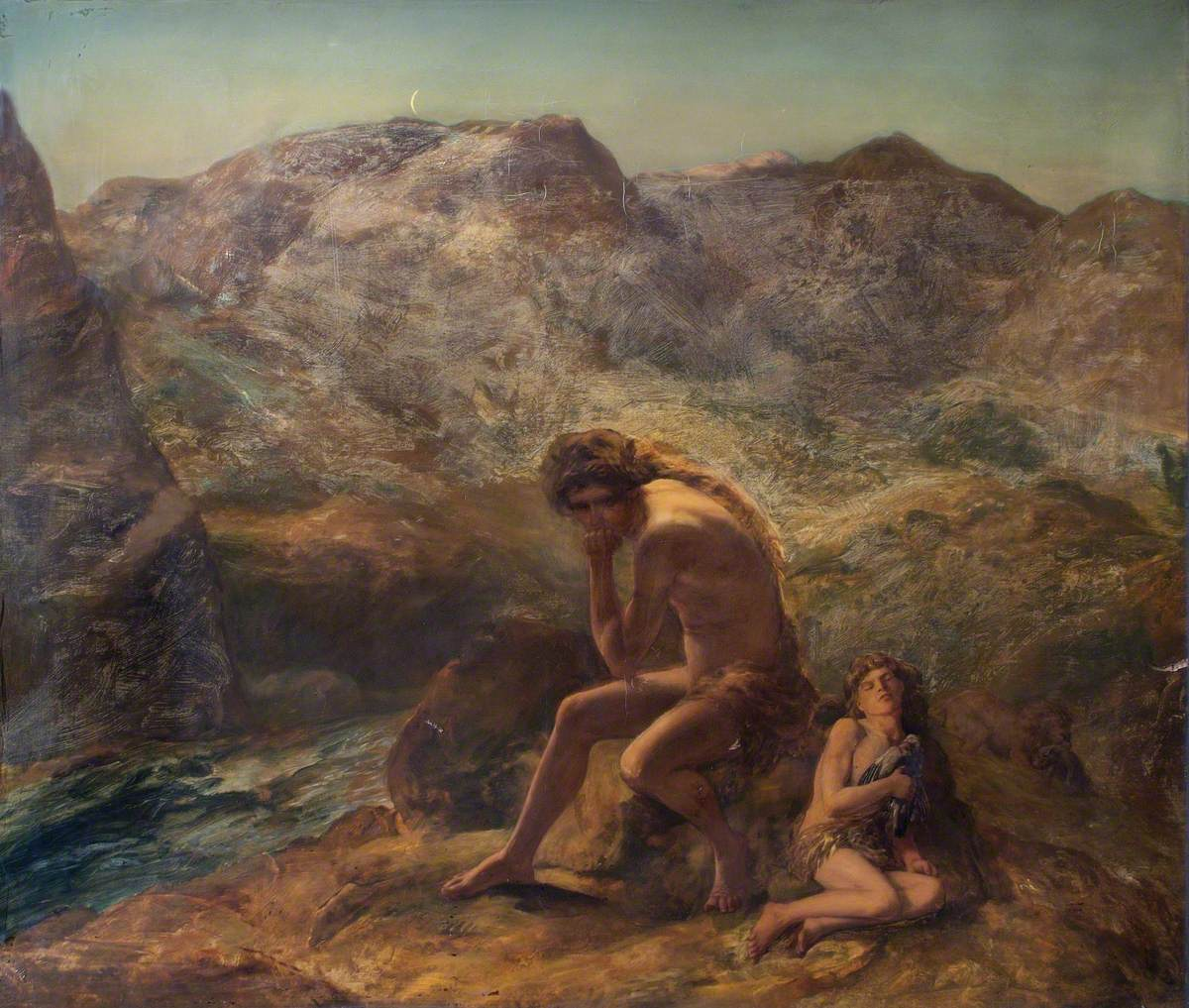
Remorse by Paul Falconer Poole

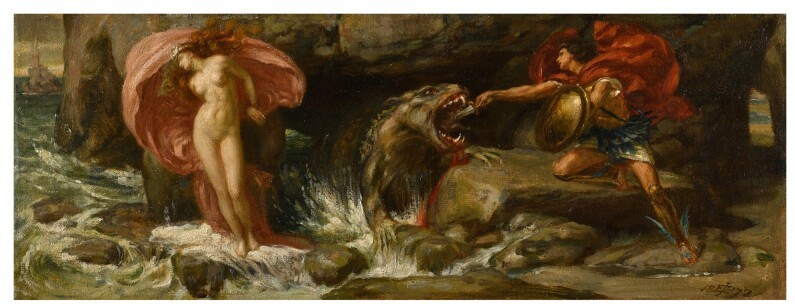
Perseus and Andromeda by Edward Poynter

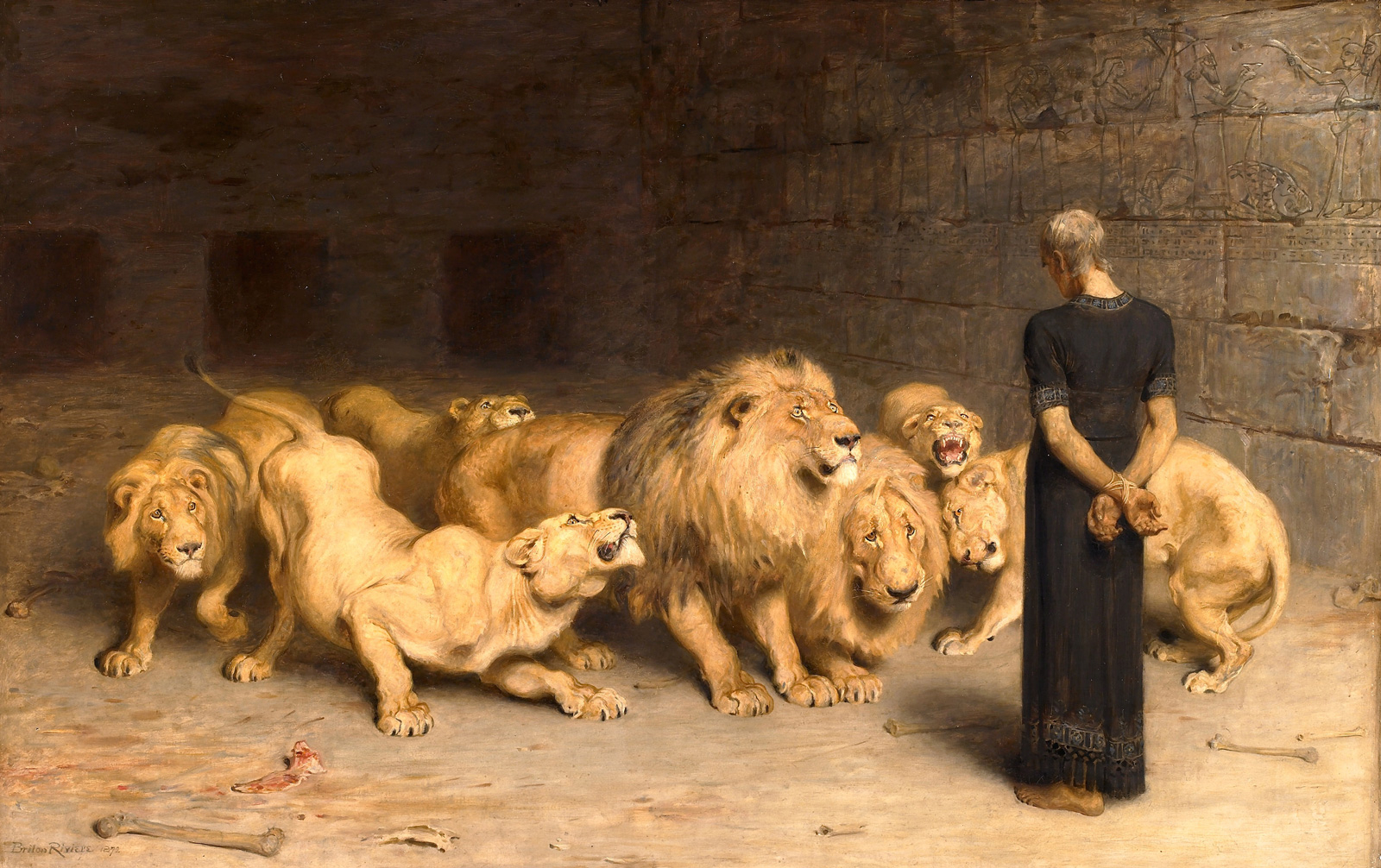
Daniel in the Lions' Den by Briton Rivière

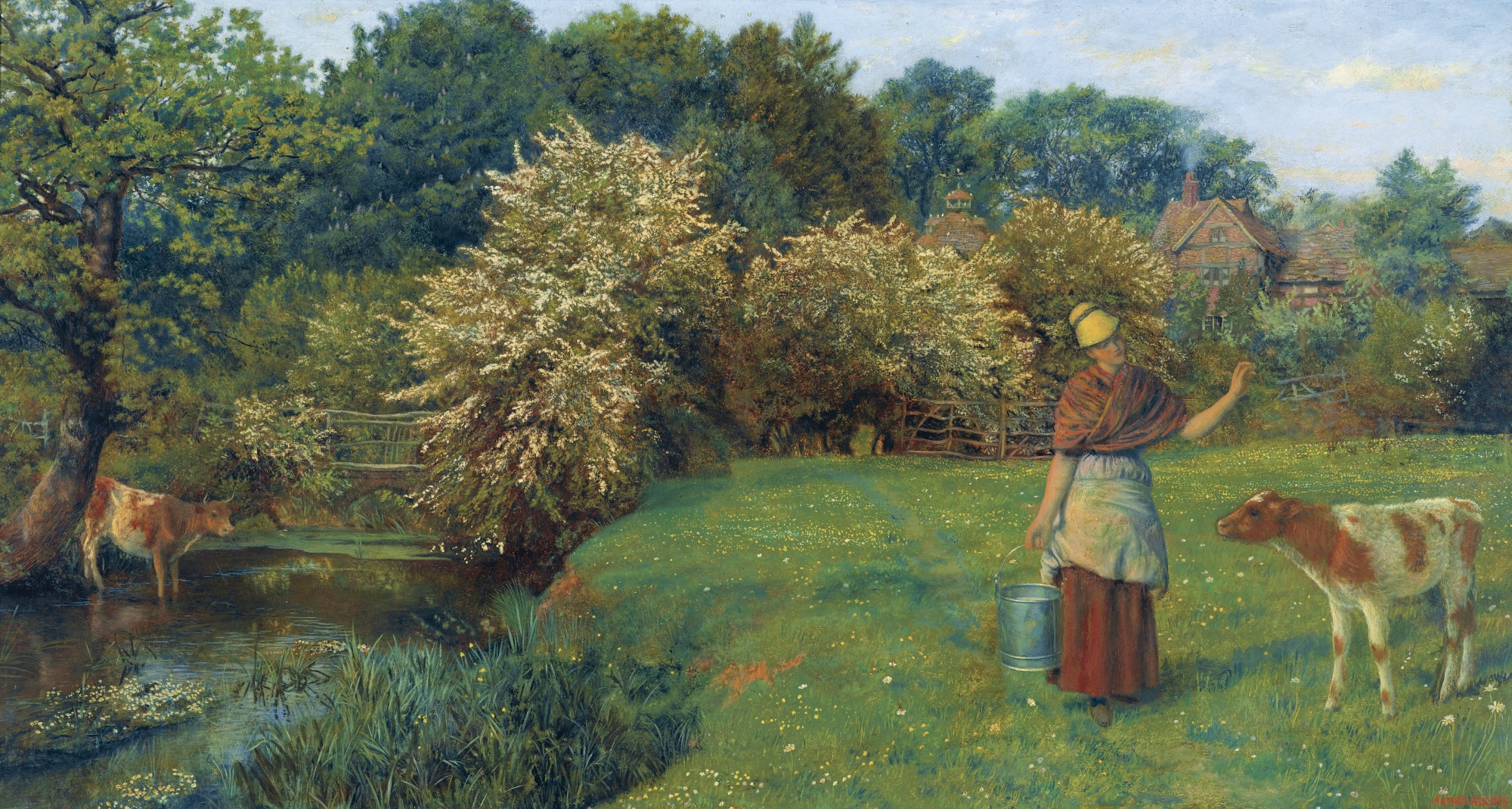
Poll the Milkmaid by Arthur Hughes

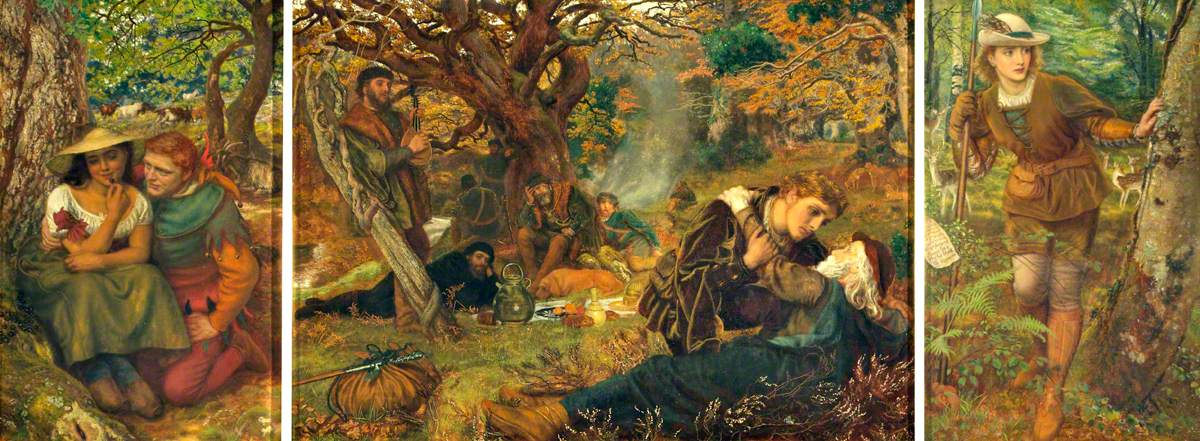
As You Like It by Arthur Hughes

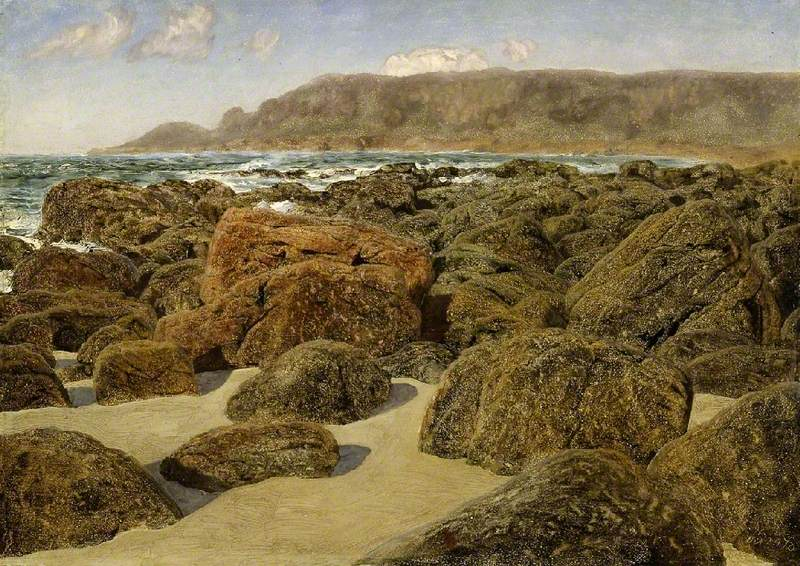
Whitesand Bay by John Brett

South Bishop Rock, Anticipations of a Wild Night by John Brett

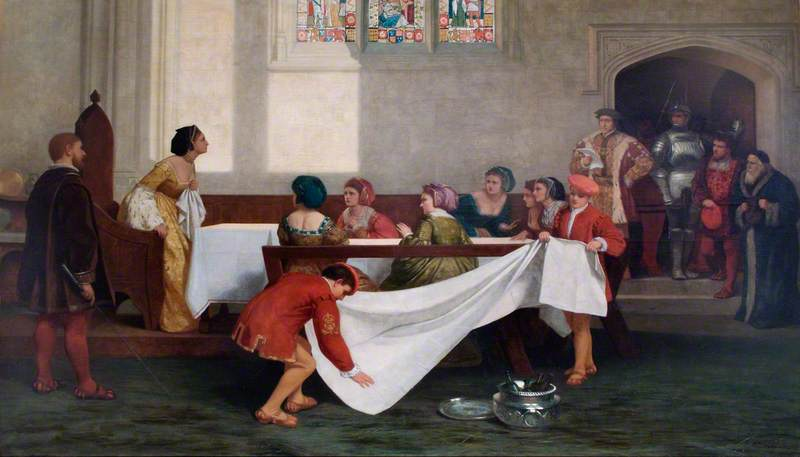
The Arrest of Anne Boleyn by David Wilkie Wynfield

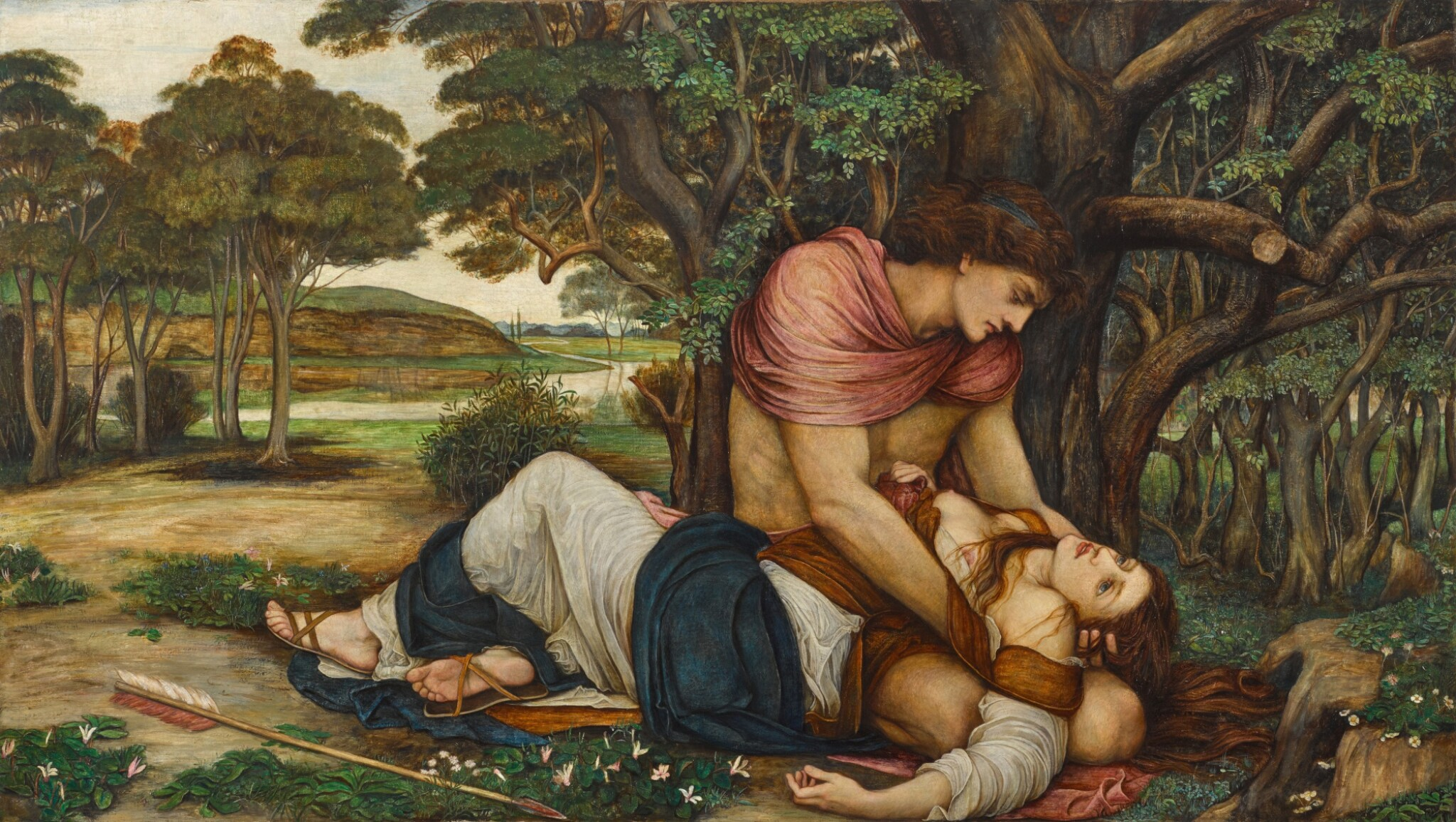
Cephalus and Procris by John Roddam Spencer Stanhope

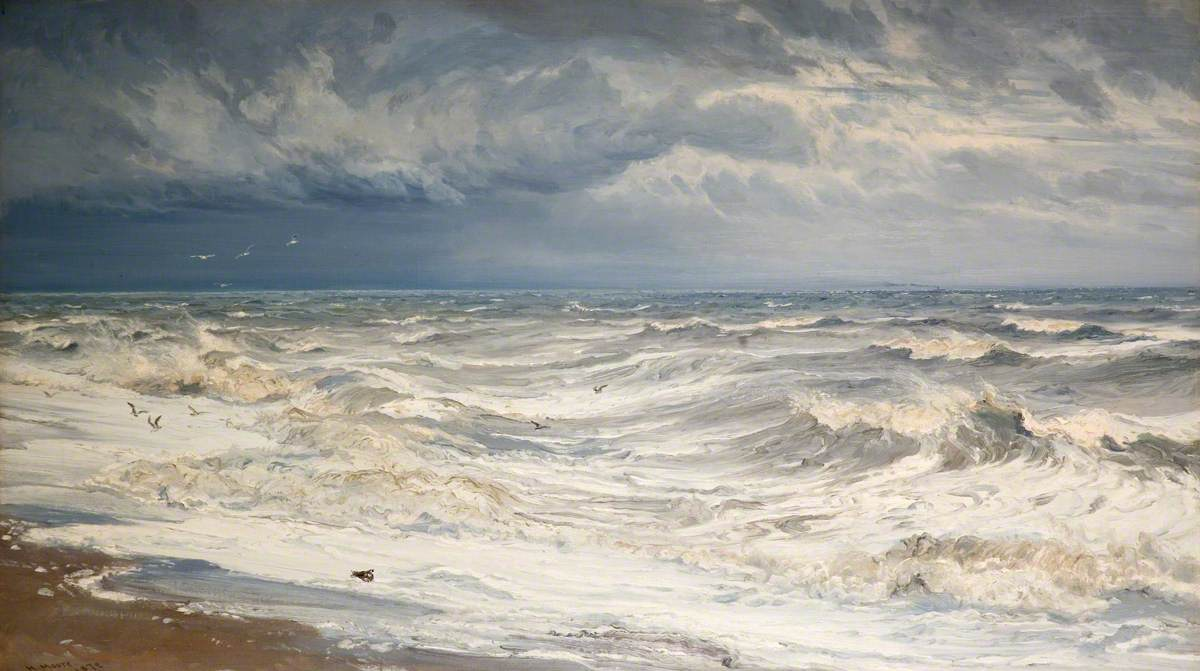
Winter Gale in the Channel by Henry Moore

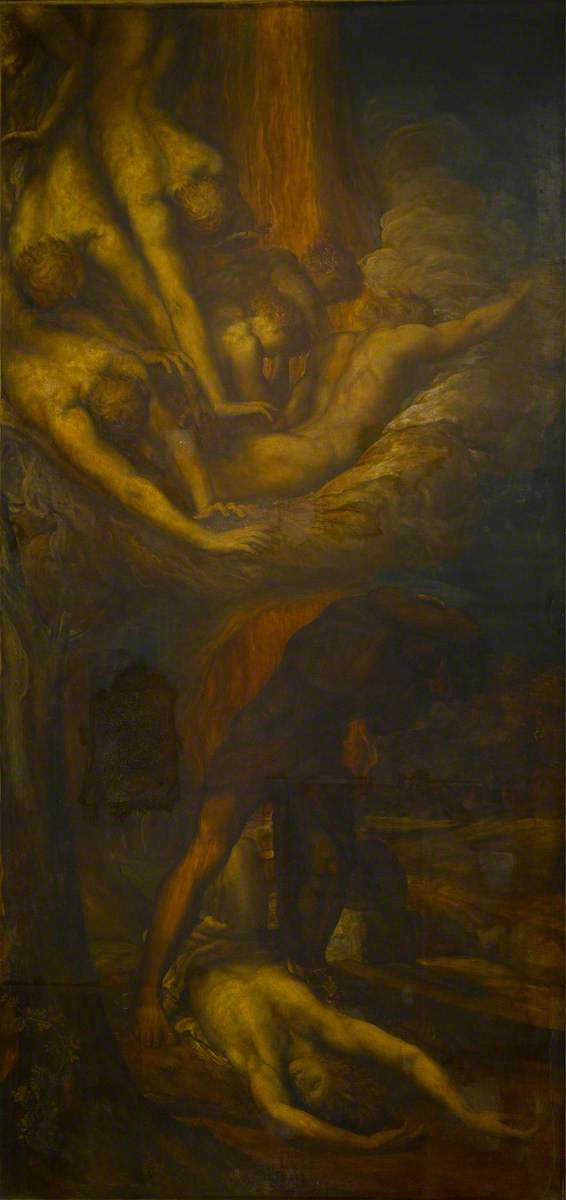
The Denunciation of Cain by George Frederic Watts

Petra by Edward Lear

Old York Gate, Adelphi by John O'Connor

The Harem by Francis John Wyburd

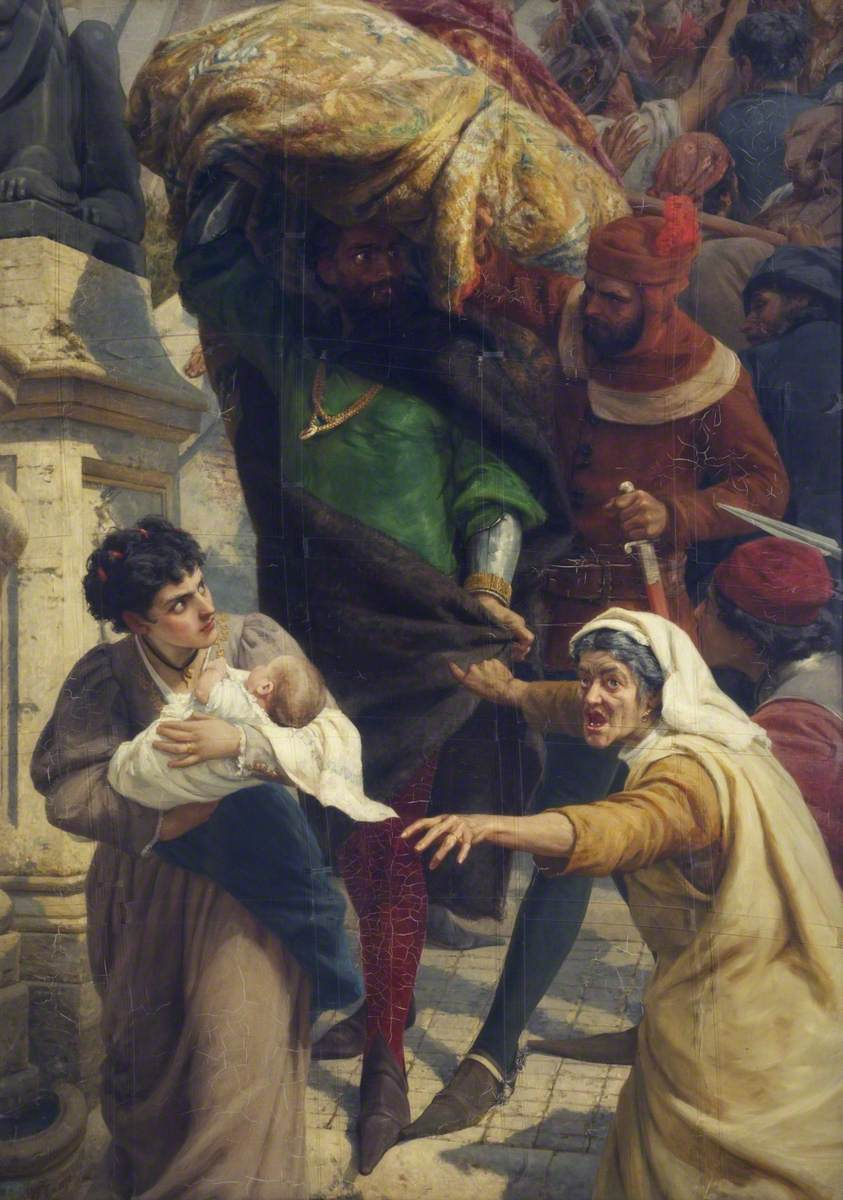
The Fall of Rienzi by Frank William Warwick Topham

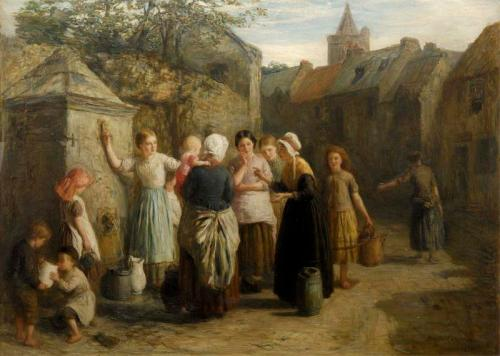
The Village Well by Hugh Cameron

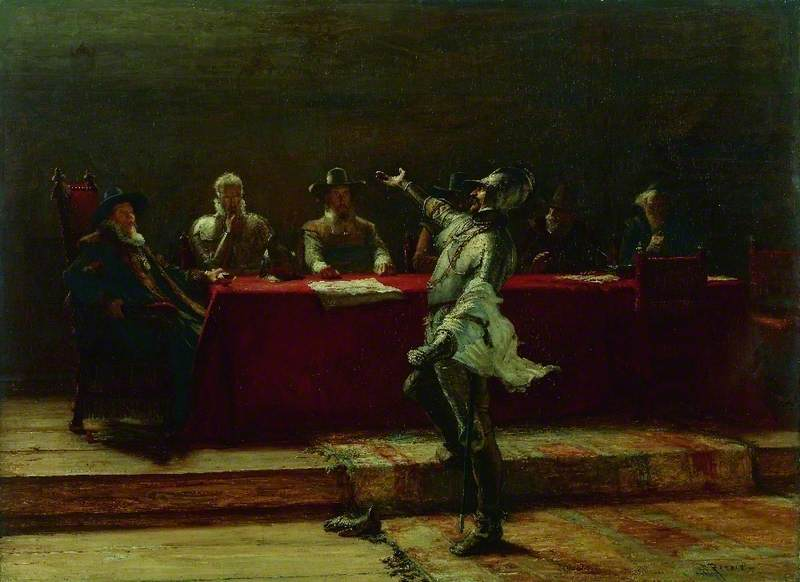
Terms to the Besieged by John Pettie

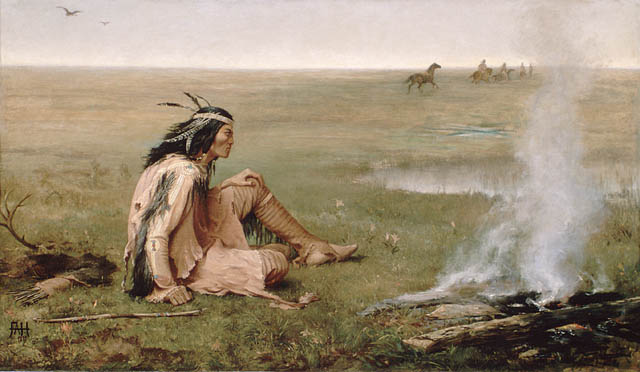
Left to Die by Frances Anne Hopkins

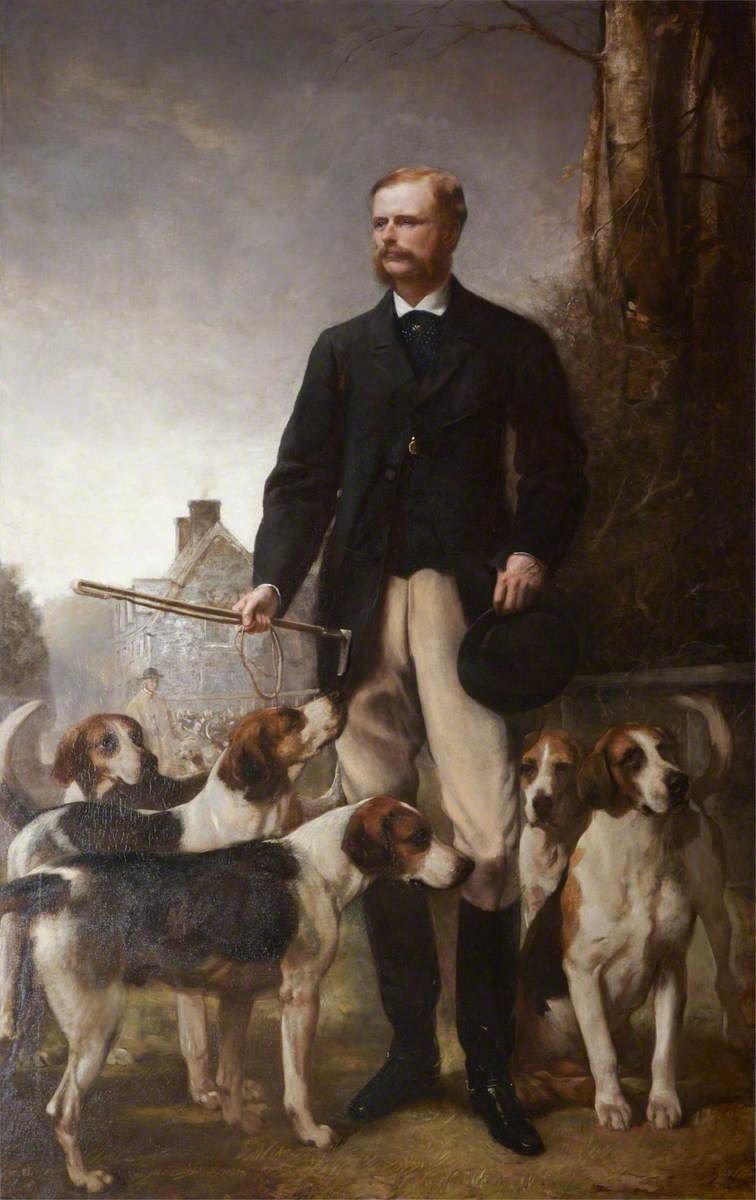
Mark Rolle by Henry Richard Graves

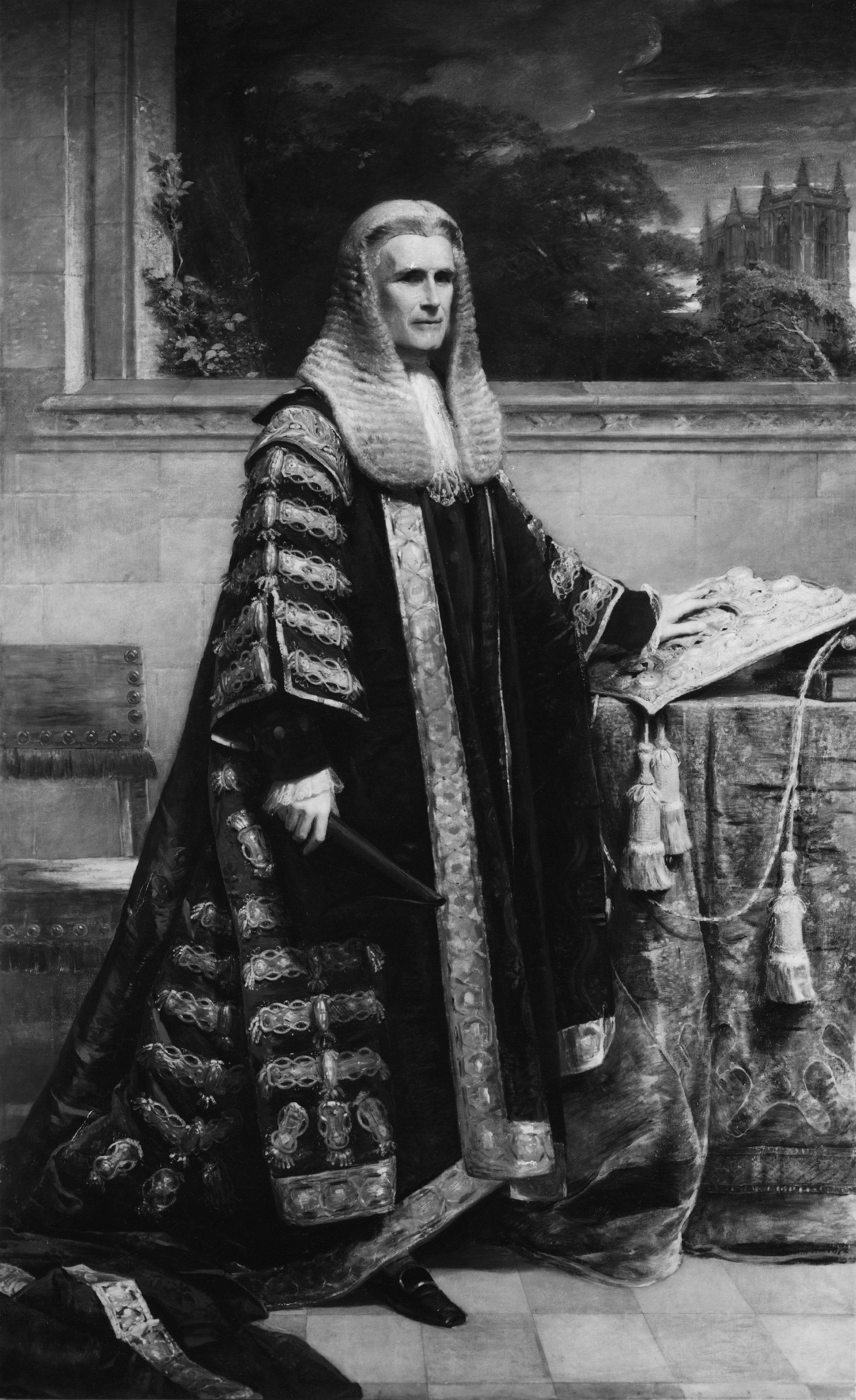
Lord Hatherley by George Richmond

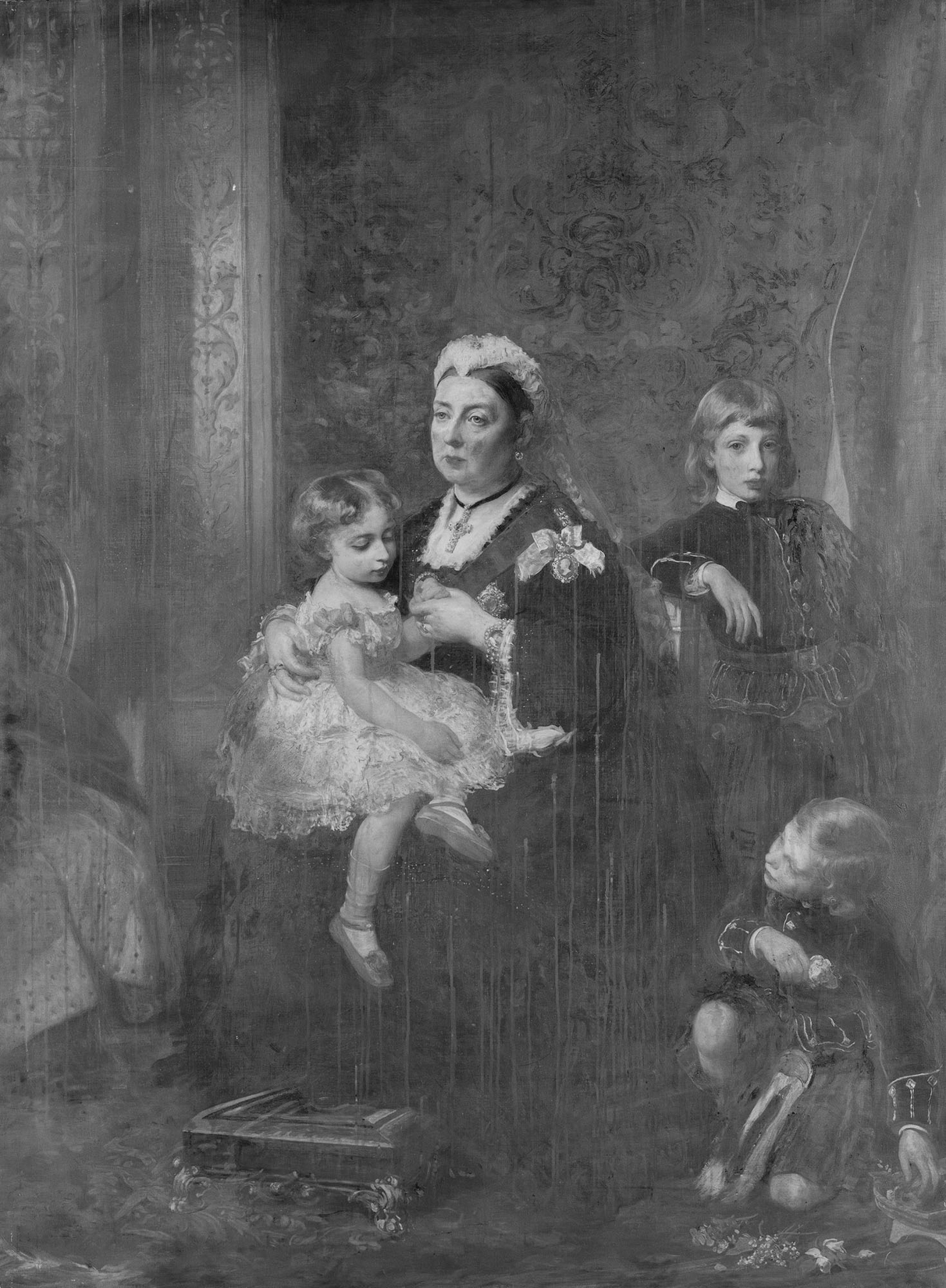
Queen Victoria with Three Grandchildren by James Sant

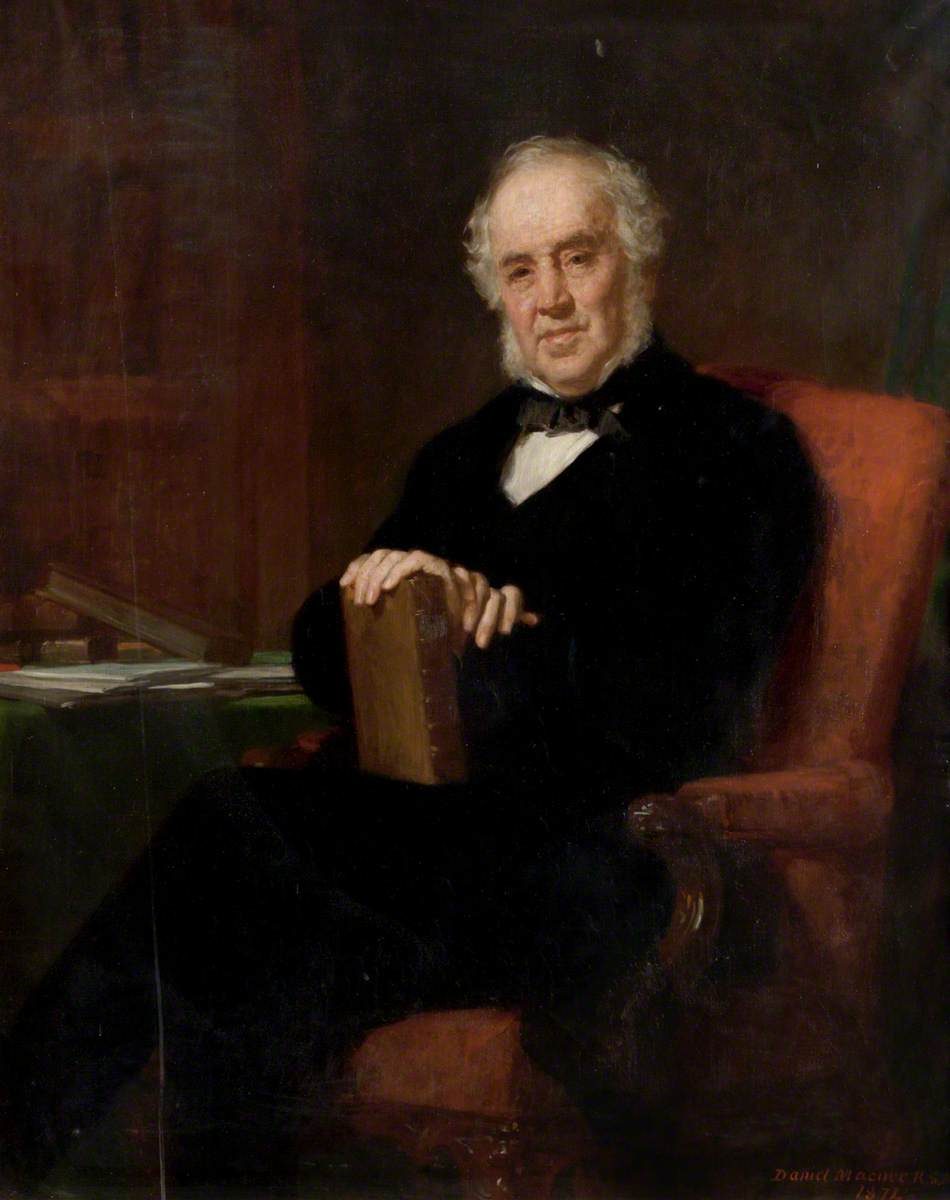
Robert Carruthers by Daniel Macnee

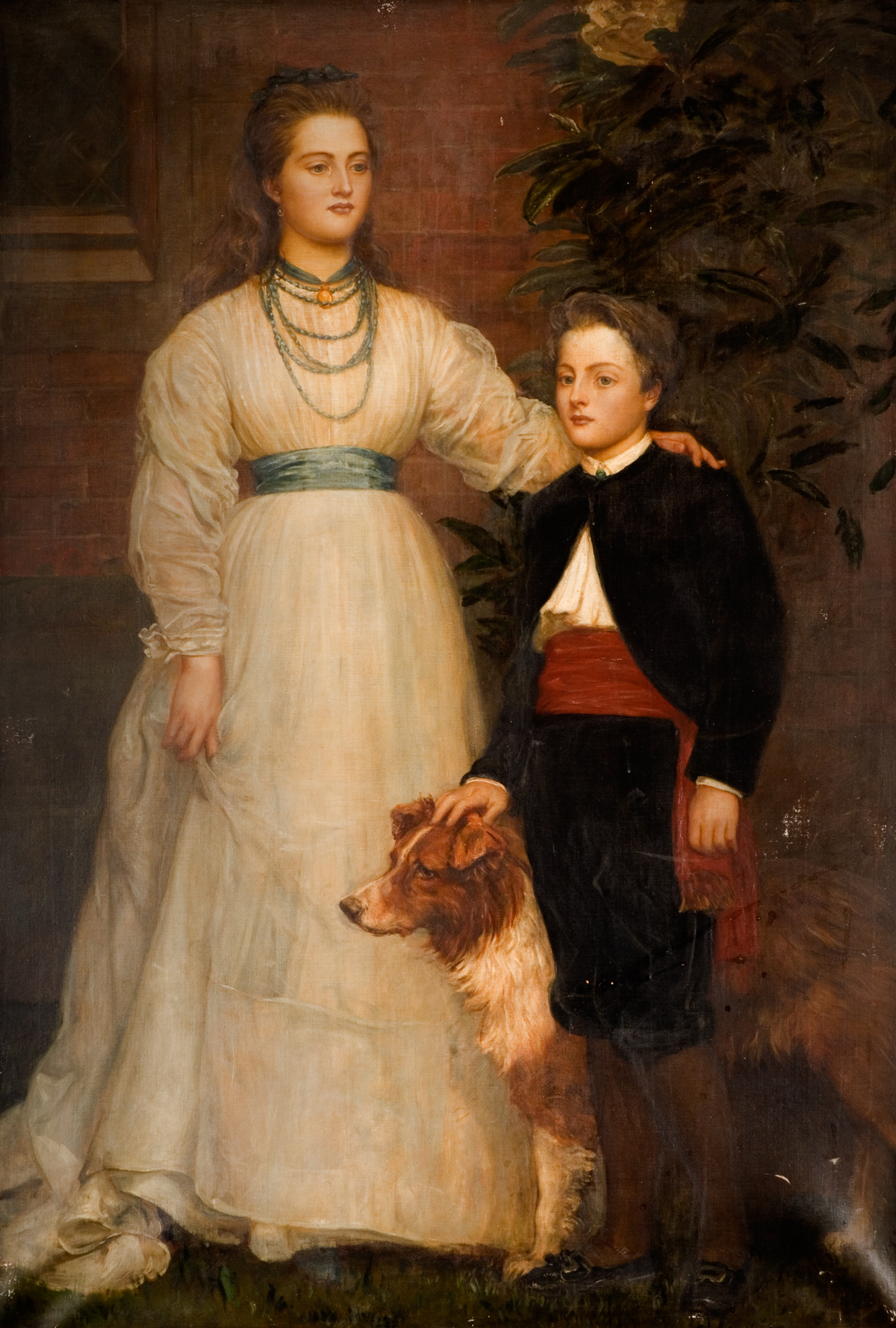
Lady Theresa Talbot and Viscount Ingrestre by Valentine Cameron Prinsep

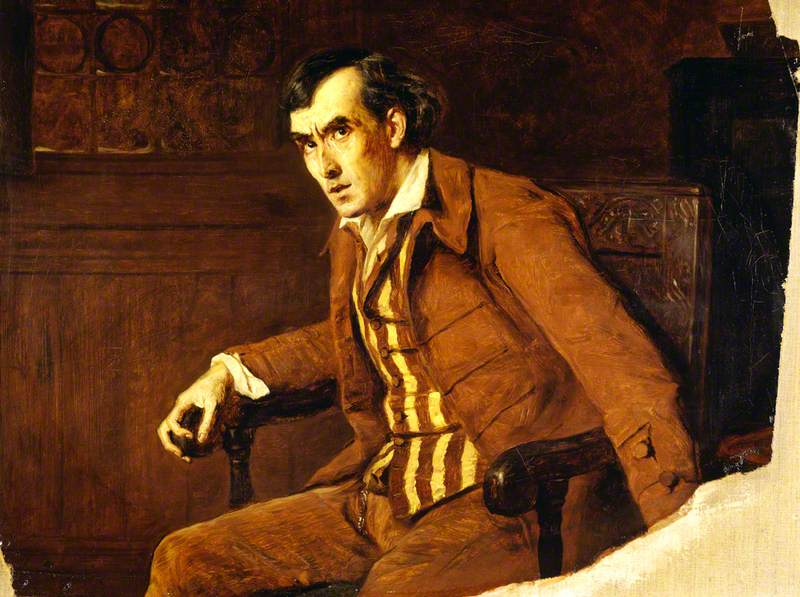
Sir Henry Irving as Matthias in The Bells by James Archer

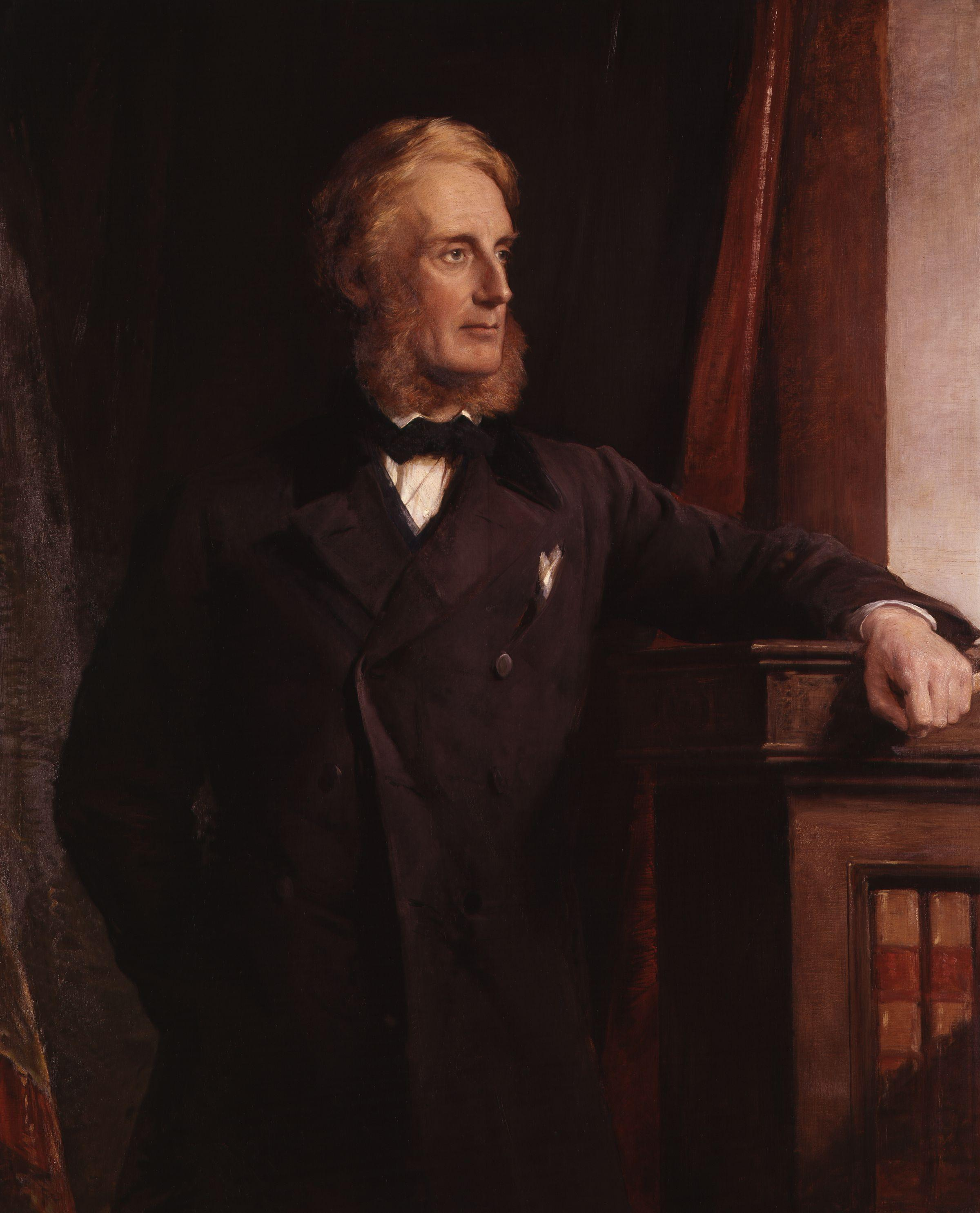
Lord Cardwell by George Richmond

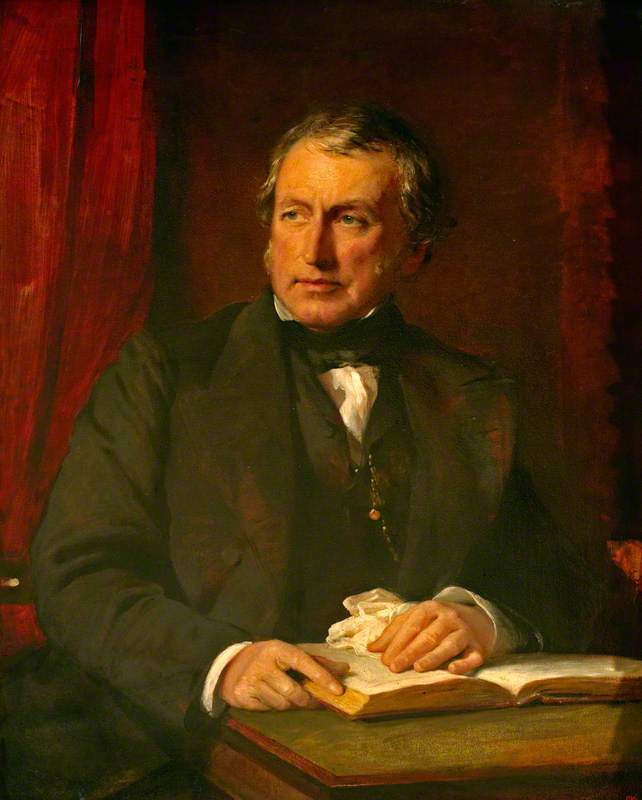
Richard Quain by George Richmond

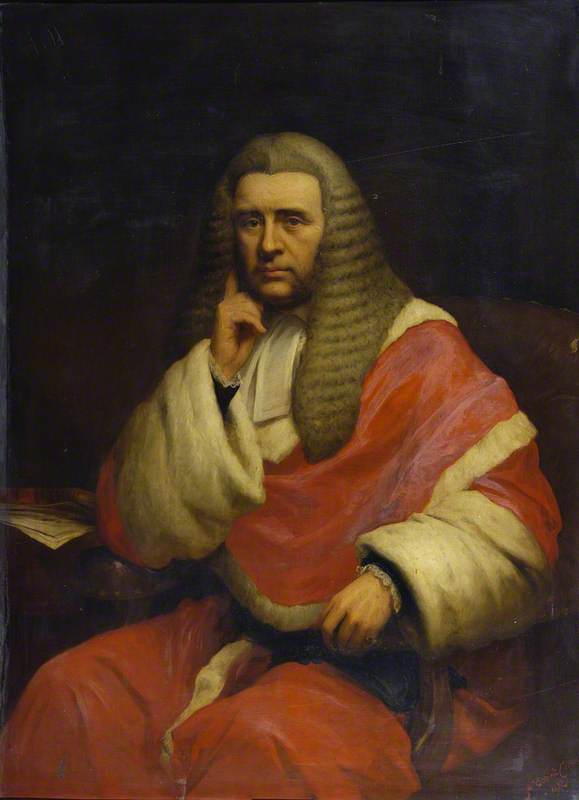
William Robert Grove by James Edgell Collins

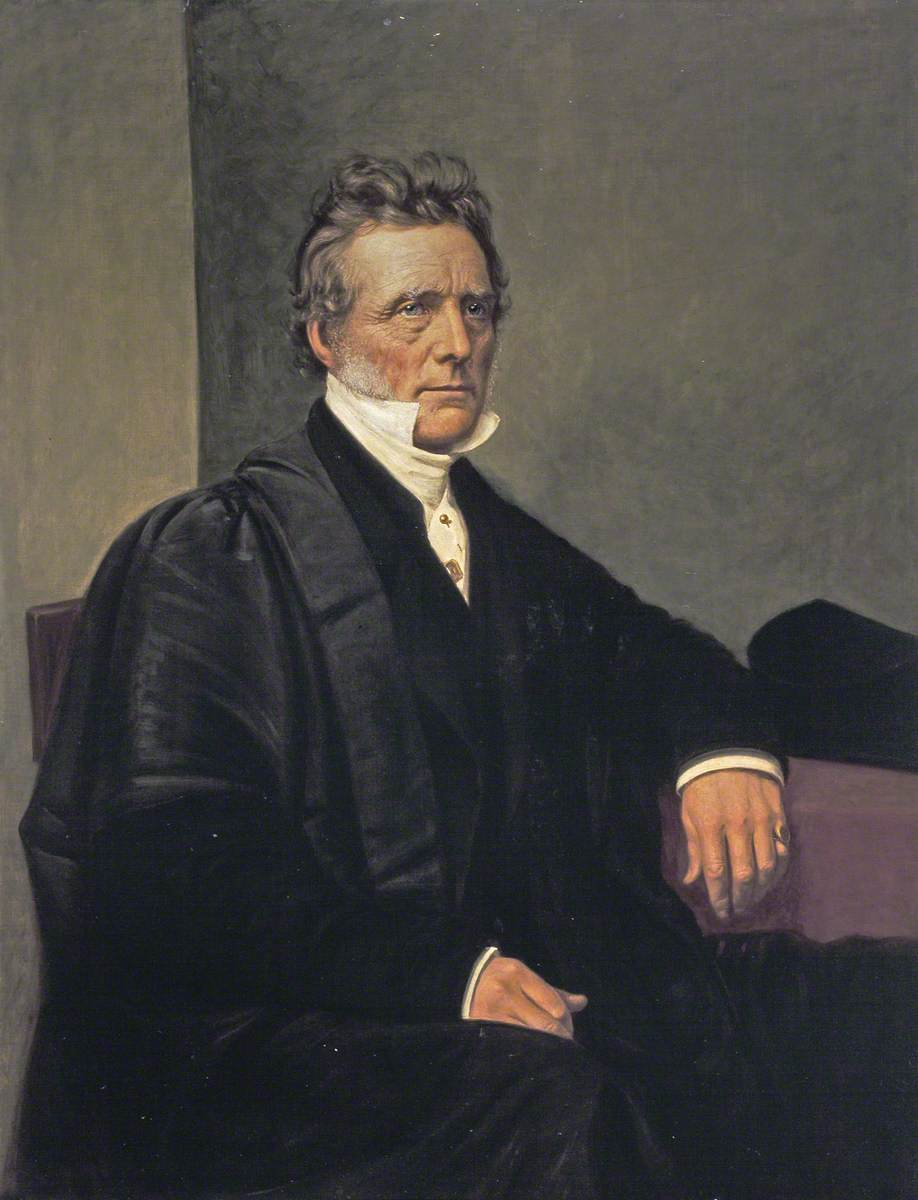
Gilbert Ainslie by Frederick Bacon Barwell

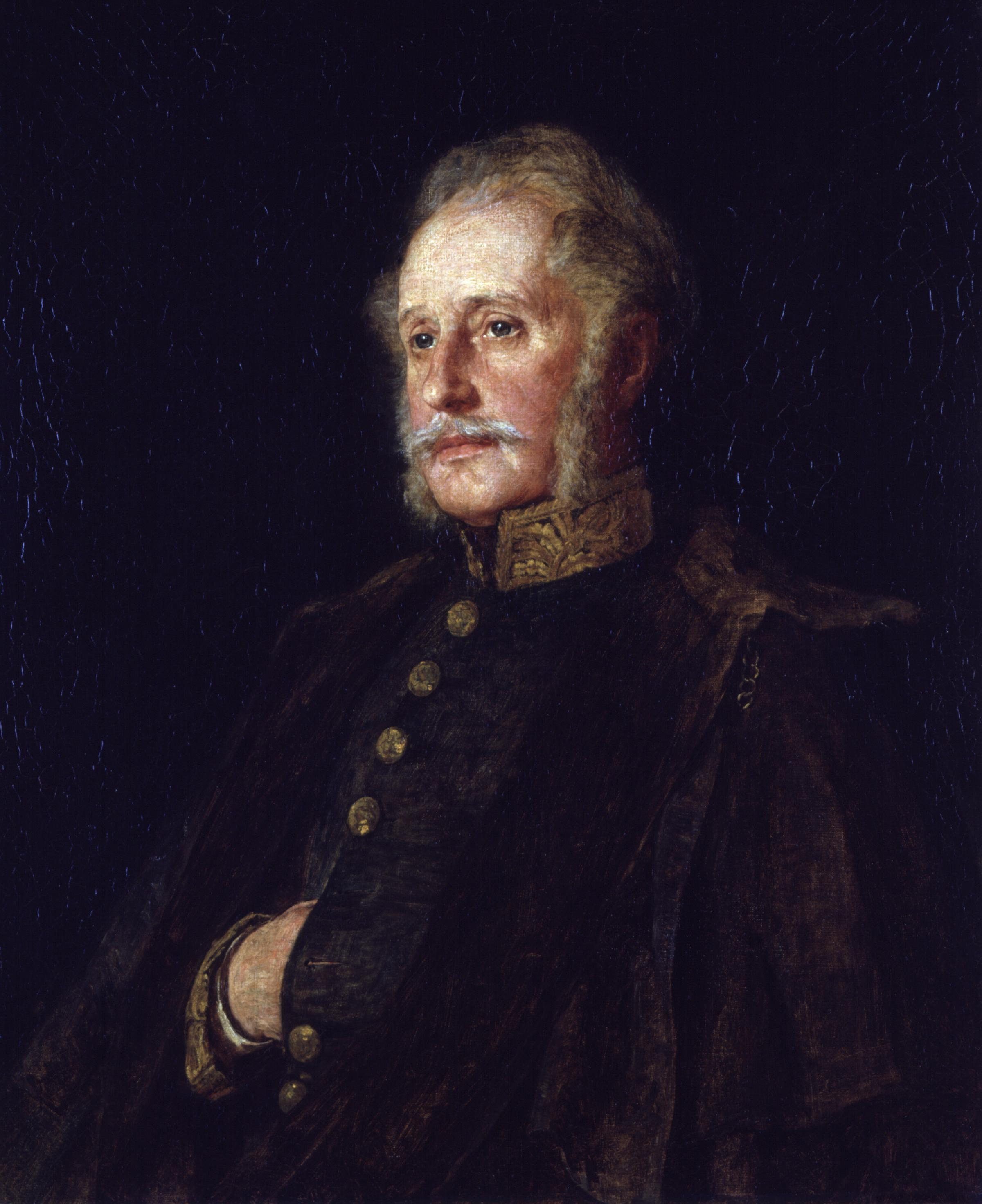
Brian Houghton Hodgson by Louisa Starr

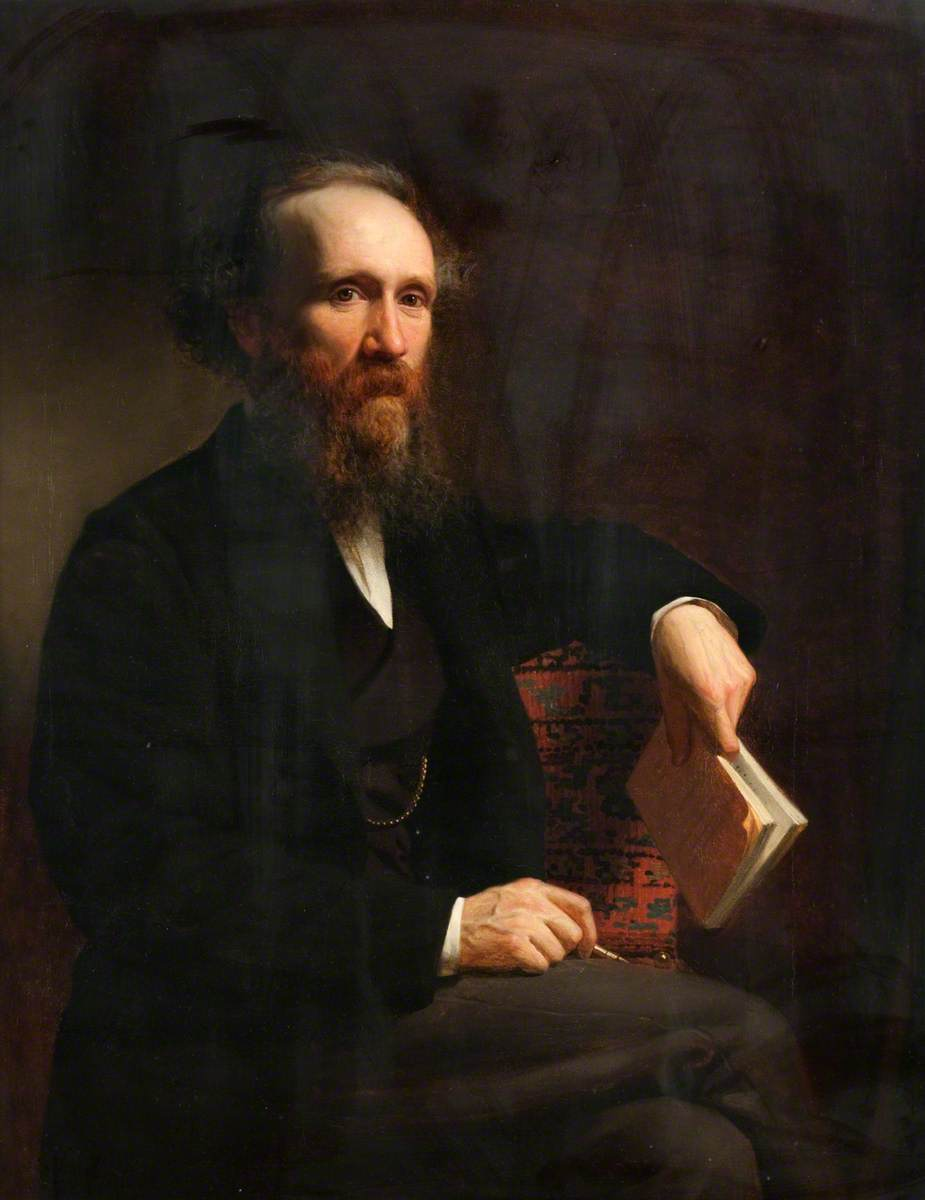
Arthur Mitchell by Norman Macbeth

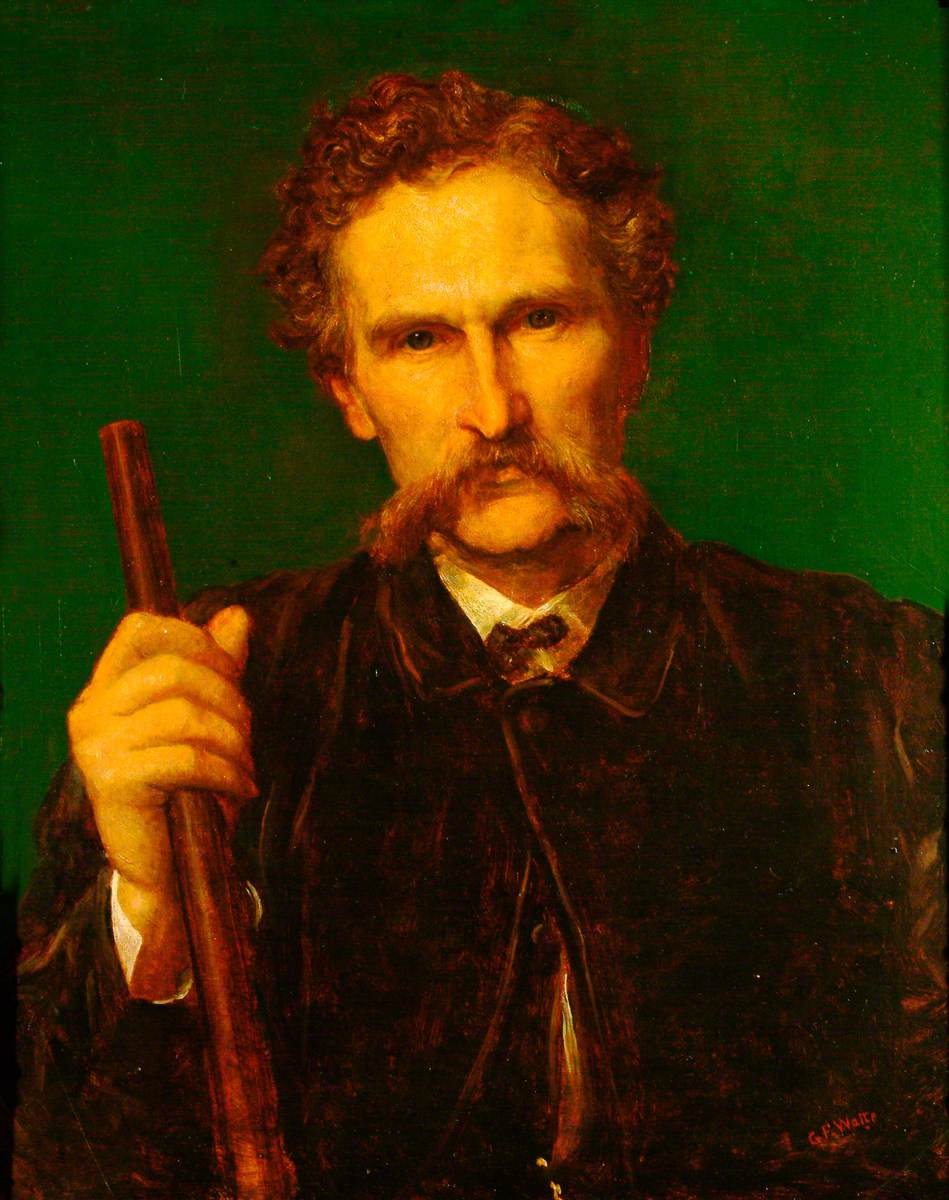
Rith H. Wallis-Dunlop by George Frederic Watts

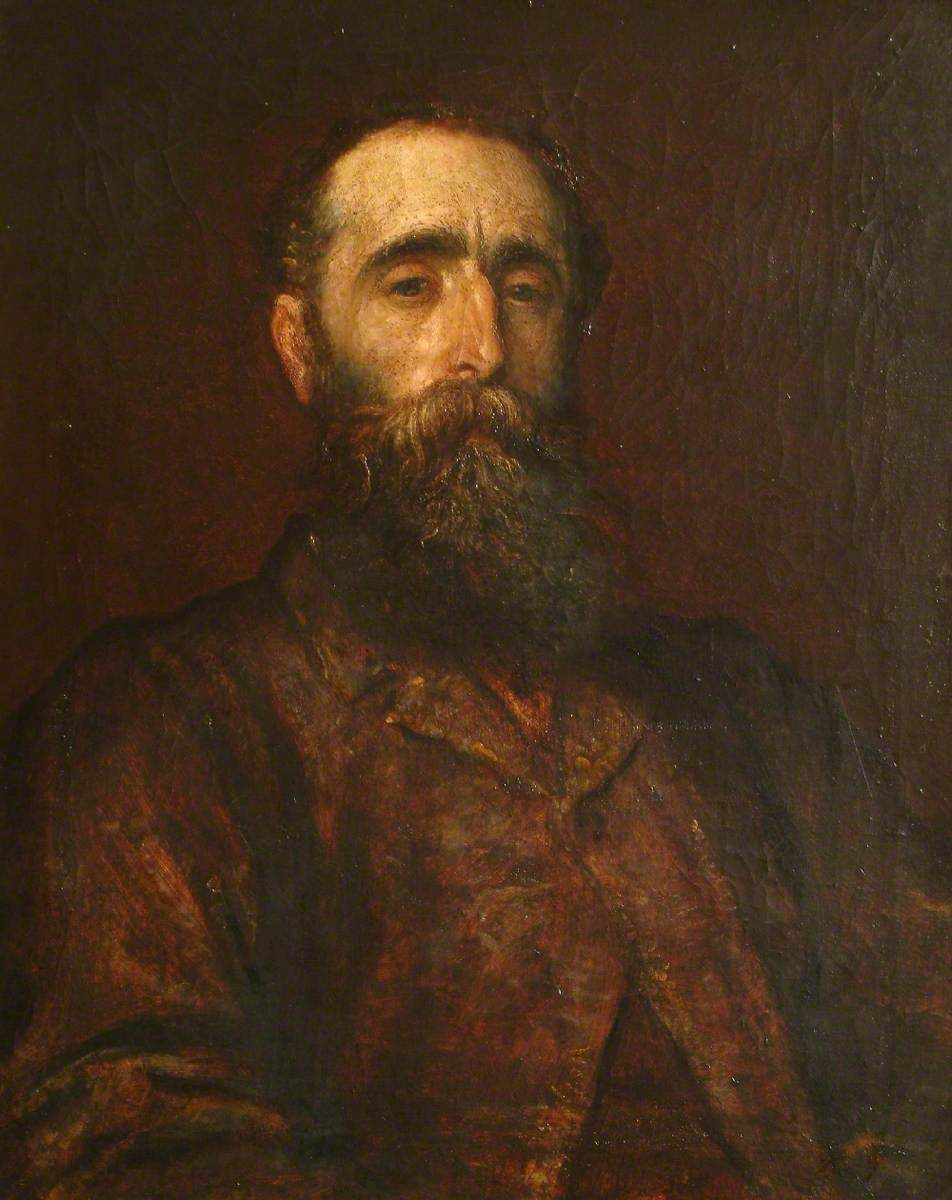
Philip Hermogenes Calderon by George Frederic Watts

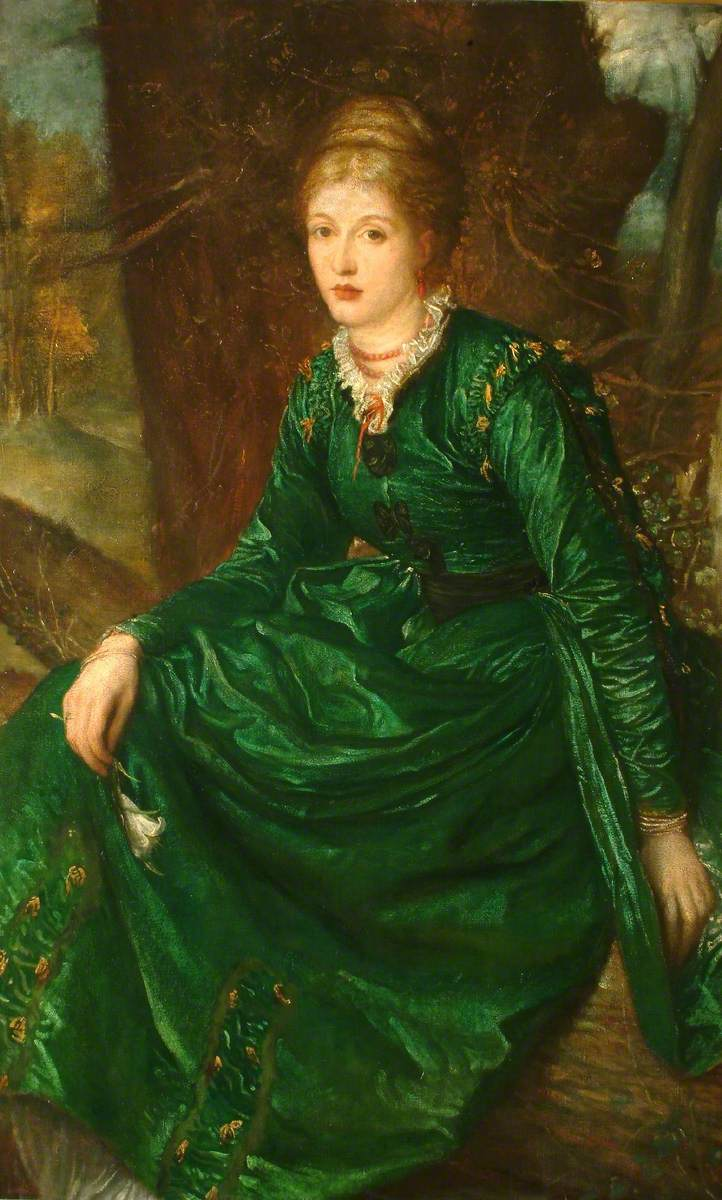
Virginia Dalrymple by George Frederic Watts

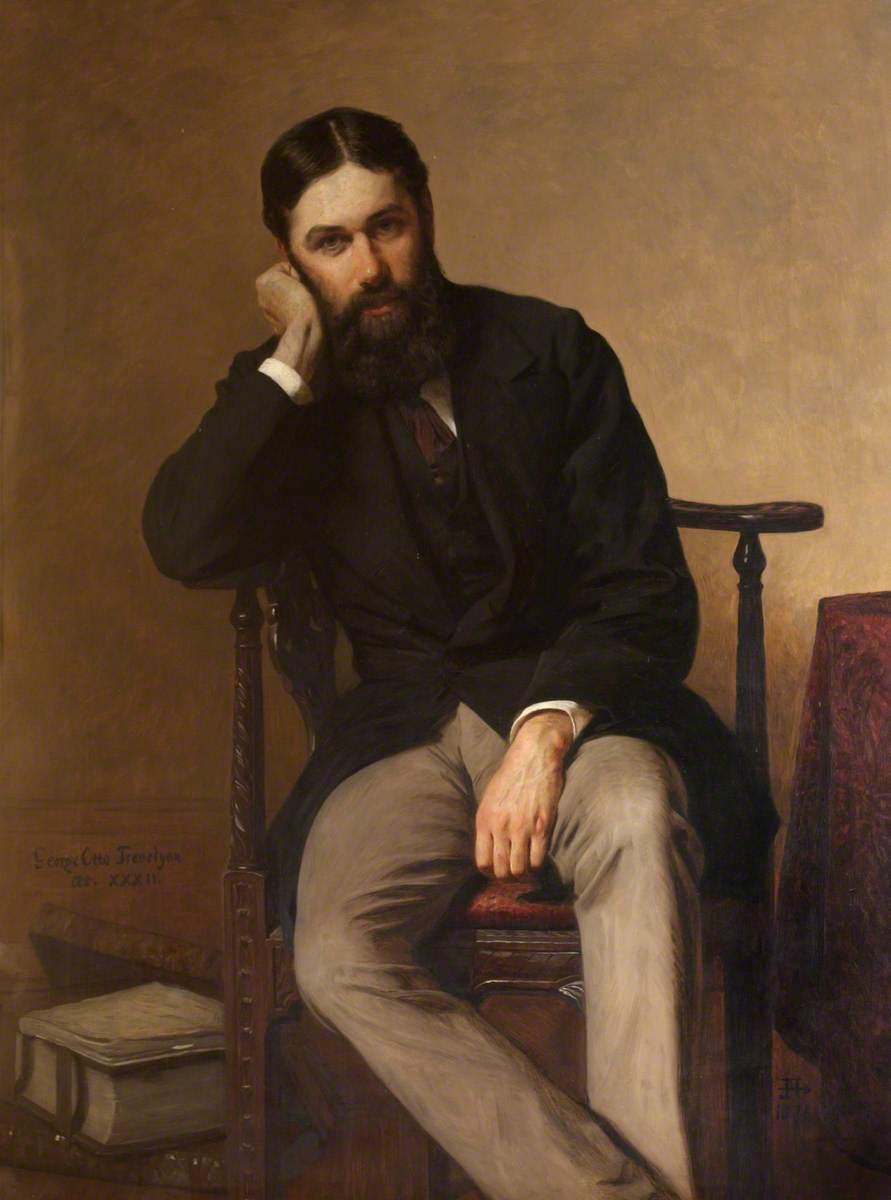
Sir George Trevelyan by James Archer

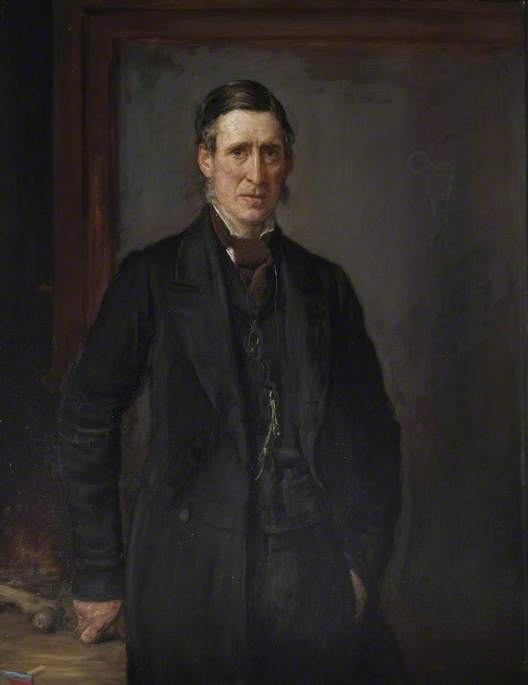
James Paget by John Everett Millais

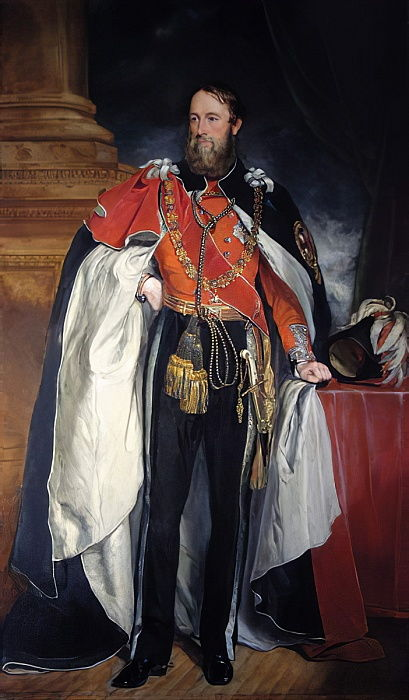
Duke of Rutland by Francis Grant

== Bibliography ==
- Bills, Mark & Knight, Vivien (ed.) William Powell Frith: Painting the Victorian Age. Yale University Press, 2006
- Ormond, Richard. The Monarch of the Glen: Landseer in the Highlands. National Galleries of Scotland, 2005.
