= James Craig (architect) =

Scottish architect (1739-1795)

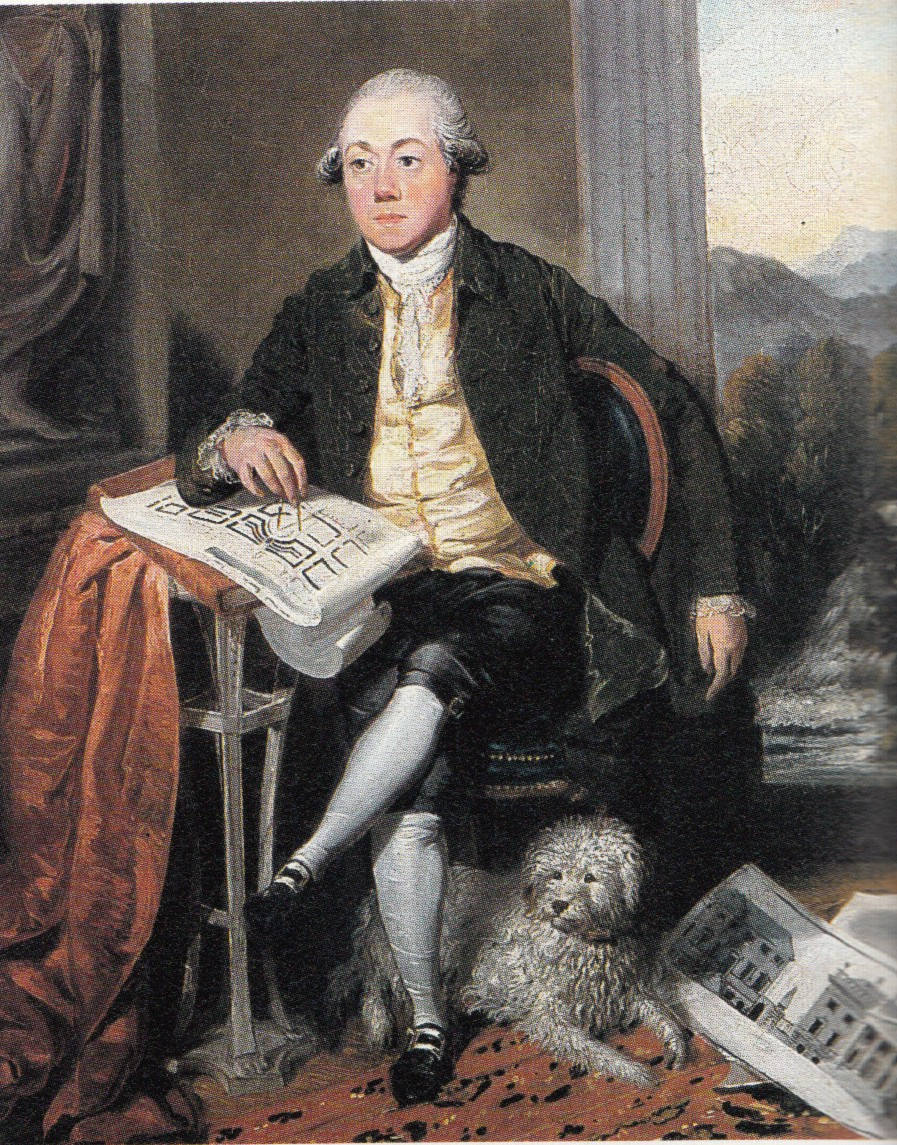
- portrait by David Allan
- Born: 31 October 1739; Edinburgh, Scotland
- Died: 23 June 1795 (aged 55)
- Occupation: Architect
- Projects: Edinburgh New Town

James Craig (31 October 1739 – 23 June 1795) was a Scottish architect who worked mostly in the Scottish Lowlands and especially his native city of Edinburgh. He is remembered primarily for his layout of the first Edinburgh New Town.

== Date of birth ==
James Craig's birth date is traditionally given as 1744, as his baptism is recorded in parish register as Tuesday 13 November 1744. However, more recent research has shown that his birth date was 31 October 1739, as recorded in the registers of George Watson's Hospital, where Craig was educated. As well as his date of birth, the records show he entered the school in 1748, and left in 1755. The 1744 date must therefore be incorrect, as it would mean he started school aged four, and left aged eleven. The baptism year, although not the date, has been shown to be in error, as 13 November fell on a Tuesday in 1739 also.

== Early life ==
James Craig was the son of William Craig (1695–1762), a merchant, and Mary Thomson (1710–1790), sister of the poet James Thomson (1700–1748). In later life, the architect was famous for being the nephew of the poet. However, closer examination of his family history shows that he had well established links to Edinburgh Town Council, Edinburgh University and the city's churches where he would later find work as an architect. He was also proud to be a Craig, and his letter seal bore the Craig arms and motto.

His father was William Craig, a son of Robert Craig (1660–1738), a businessman and successful local politician, and Elizabeth Handieside. He had eight siblings of whom James, John and Janet lived into later life, with other sisters Marion and Agnes also reaching adulthood. Witnesses to the births of Robert Craig's children denote his political and professional friends. These included politicians with links to the University and Town Council, and clergymen.

From 1694 Robert Craig had trained to be a merchant in Edinburgh. Though late in life to do so, this decision was a good one as he and his elder brother, John Craig, a lawyer, formed an effective partnership in managing money, loans, merchandise and property. The family legacy was that the architect James Craig inherited a family used to discussing and managing property planning and building.

From being a burgess and guildbrother of Edinburgh and a church elder (Greyfriars, Edinburgh, 1701 on), by 1704 Robert had been elected to the city's Town Council. Within two years he was Edinburgh University's Treasurer, and then Baillie of Leith in 1707, an Edinburgh Baillie after 1708, and Water Baillie of Leith in 1709. His rise was impressive enough to be elected a Governor of George Heriot's Hospital in 1710. The very same year he was made a burgess of the burgh of Canongate.

The next decade saw Robert Craig's political career continue to flourish. In 1713 he was elected Baron Baillie of Canongate, and from 1714 he became Edinburgh Town Council's moderator of stent tax, annually levied on property values, and its Dean of Guild. As Dean he held one of the top three posts in the Town Council beside the Treasurer and Lord Provost. He served a full three-year term in this post until 1717. In this period, from 1714 to 1716, he was Edinburgh's Commissioner of the General Convention of Royal Burghs. Here he saw applications from other Scottish towns and cities to expand and improve through new harbours, bridges and roads.

In his later years as an active politician until 1720 Robert Craig could be found in Town Council meetings and affairs as "Old Dean of Guild" Craig or "Old Baillie" Craig. He oversaw tax collection, accounts, the city's market and property management. He was clearly a capable and trusted administrator of the city's affairs, and one who oversaw building up the city's interests and physical size. As well as writing reports on the city's finances, in 1719 he also inspected land around Broughton and Multrees Hill - the area near where the New Town was planned out.

Robert Craig would have known many architects and tradesmen as well as politicians. Not least among these magistrates would have been George Drummond. From 1723 Drummond had the ambition to create Edinburgh's New Town through petitions to Parliament to building Register House.

Robert Craig's sons, James (1691–1775) and John became clerks to the Presbyterian Church of Scotland's Assembly in Edinburgh, and after 1715 joined his brother William in being made a burgess and guildbrother of Edinburgh through his father. The Craig family home was a temple tenement at the foot of West Bow facing the Corn Market. In later years, they all, including James the architect, lived in the first floor apartment of this property.

In business, Robert traded in many different goods but died leaving debts to be paid. William took on his business and managed his father's bank account into the 1740s. Newspaper advertisements from the 1730s and 1740s reveal that his shop was in Forglen's Land from where he also traded in many goods, including tobacco and sugar. William did not follow his father into Town Council politics, but in 1745 he was elected by the magistrates to be its sword and mace bearer for formal processions and ceremonies which gave an allowance of £200 (Scots). However, at the same time, like his father, he too ran into business difficulties.

Of the six children he and Mary Thomson had, James was the only one to survive infancy. By then 1750s, William Craig's business was in serious decline, and through rights of his grandfather and father's lives as merchants and familial poverty, James was able to claim a place at George Watson's College, which had been recently set up as a school to educate the sons of "deceased and indigent" merchants.

Although James Craig the architect celebrated his family's history primarily through the poet, James Thomson, a review of the books and goods he kept at the family home indicate that there were family heirlooms there inherited from his grandfather Robert. These included a twenty-four-hour clock and pewter plates. Other inheritances were probably old books on religion which Robert, James and John had kept.

However, it was clear from his business affairs, library and goods, that Craig spent money collecting books and objects celebrating James Thomson and the poets and followers in his circle in England. In fact, Thomson's poetry influenced his work as an architect. He often edited his Uncle's poems to quote them on plans, or derived decorations for buildings based on Thomson's most famous poem, the Seasons. In business, he asked members of the Thomson family to help him. For his contract with the Royal College of Physicians of Edinburgh he had the financial support of blood relatives James Bell, a Minister in Coldstream, and rector of Lanark Grammar School, Robert Thomson.

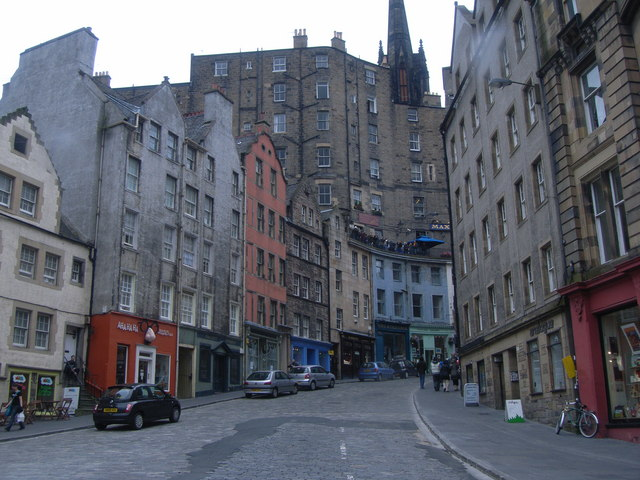
Craig's house at West Bow, Edinburgh

From 1773 he lived with his uncle, also James Craig, Session Clerk to the High Court, at the foot of West Bow, off the Grassmarket.

In 1775 he even donated a portrait by John Baptist Medina (1659–1710) of the poet to Edinburgh University, which was widely reported in the press and had a dedication to Thomson on its frame. Craig promoted himself as the most celebrated living relative of Thomson. Throughout his career as an architect he was widely noted as the poet's nephew in books, the media, and participated in public and private celebrations of Thomson's life and work in both England and Scotland.

As he grew older it was clear that James Craig family line was going to end with the architect's death. However, he had contact with relatives from the Thomson family in Lanarkshire. James Craig's focus on Thomson led to his obituary in volume IV of the Scots Register of 1796 suggesting that the architect believed he should be chosen for work primarily because of his relationship to the famous poet rather than sound business practice. The validity of this remark can be debated but it was clear to all that family commitments played significant roles in Craig's business and architecture.

== Architectural training ==
In 1755 Craig left school aged sixteen. This was because he was to be the apprentice to the incorporation of wrights and masons of Edinburgh, and its Council Deacon Patrick Jamieson. Given the anticipation of the city's New Town through suggested plans, petitions, pamphlets and most recently the Edinburgh Buildings Act 1753 (26 Geo. 2. c. 36), taking up a career in building was confident and ambitious. The incorporation and Craig agreed that his training would begin in 1759 and run for the normal six-year period. Writing in April 1777, as an architect, Craig told Edinburgh Town Council's Chamberlain that he had been "bred in the executive part" of his business as an architect.

Whilst studying under Jamieson Craig would have seen and known the mason's building projects. These included the new Exchange building where Jamieson was chief mason. Through his master and such prestigious projects, Craig would have met a number of architects, including John Adam (1721–1792). He had designed the Exchange and was to later supervise Craig's work in Edinburgh and elsewhere.

Like other apprentices, Craig was also expected to read architectural treatises, such as Palladio's books on architecture, and learn how to draw the architectutral orders, plan and survey buildings, use building materials and prepare accounts. The architecture books and equipment he kept in his apartment, together with sculptures of artists and writers there, indicate that Craig presented himself as a cultivated, skilled and tasteful architect. Like John Adam, Craig did not go on a "Grand Tour" of Europe to draw antiquities and study at academies or under other architects.

In fact, in 1762, just three years into his apprenticeship, his father died. Quite what the twenty three year old apprentice decided to do then remains unrecorded. Surviving evidence suggests he chose to develop a career as a draughtsman and architect.

He was due to complete his apprenticeship in 1765, and yet his name appeared in a published plan for the proposed bridge over the Nor Loch in the Scots Magazine in July 1763 North Bridge. Signed "James Craig Delint" it indicated his skill as a draughtsman, and intention to become known as a designer or architect.

Although the incorporation did not record Craig submitting his "essay" for examination and being accepted into the incorporation as a freeman mason in the usual way, in June 1765 the incorporation's rolls of apprentices does noted Deacon Jamieson discharging James Craig as his apprentice. This same year Craig was due to sit his essay to become a freeman mason of the incorporation, but the discharge meant that he missed this exam and never formally entered the incorporation itself. In 1767 he claimed his bounty payment from his school for completing his apprenticeship and signed a document for the school in 1769 to certify the same. By then he had set himself up as an architect. Earliest works include drawings for the new bridge over Nor Loch in 1763 and then in 1765, Craig also prepared a plan for a road running from Holyrood through the south of Canongate which was completed for the Middle Road District. In 1766 he designed a new town plan for Edinburgh Town Council and he soon became famous for his final plan of it the following year. It may have been because of work that he claimed his apprenticeship to be completed four years after it was signed off by Jamieson. Both the bridge and road indicate Craig's interest in town planning.

== Architectural work ==
=== Edinburgh New Town and town planning ===
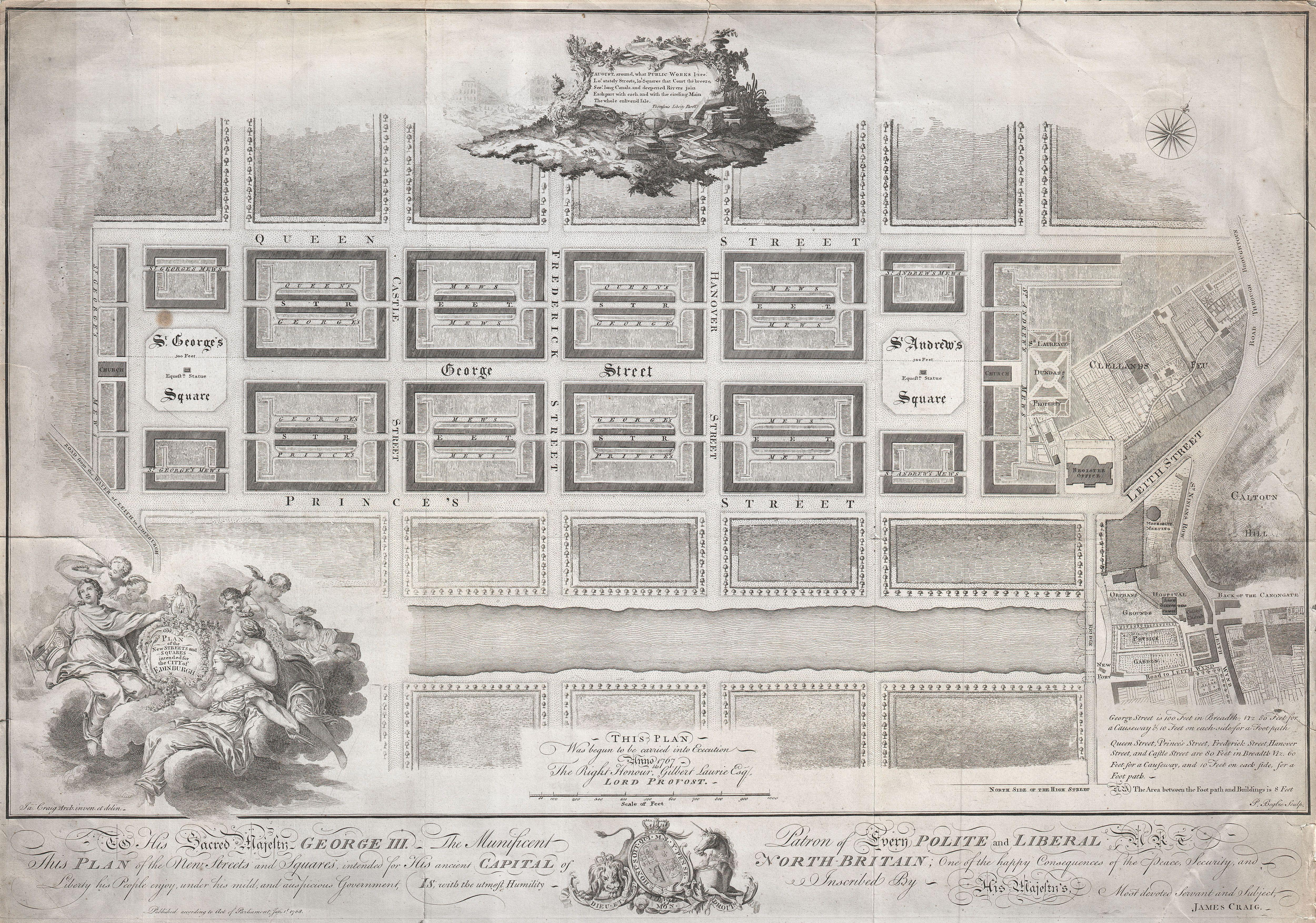
Plan for the New Town by James Craig (1768)

Following on from his work in 1765, Craig entered the competition to plan the New Town of Edinburgh in 1766 through which he won his fame and reputation as an architect. He spent the next fifteen years working on plans and buildings for the New Town, and presented two of these in the portrait painting David Allan made in 1781; a New Town plan with a central circus, and the Royal College of Physicians Hall with proposed wings to either side.

Plans for a New Town, to ease overcrowding in the medieval Royal burgh of Edinburgh, had been suggested since the late 17th century. However, it was not until the middle of the 18th century that Lord Provost George Drummond (1688–1766) succeeded in extending the town boundary to encompass the fields to the north of the Nor Loch. A competition was held in January 1766, in which six plans were entered. Craig's was considered the best, and he was awarded the prize; the Freedom of the City and a gold medal.

However, his design was not initially considered suitable for construction, and was reviewed by a committee, including the law judges Lord Kames (1696–1782), Lord Elliock (1712–1793) and Lord Hailes (1726–1792) and architects John Adam and William Mylne (1734–1790), and Sir James Clerk, 3rd Baronet (1709–1783). With the judges advice Craig drew up the final approved version, and a feuing plan to match it so that prospective property developers and owners could see what the New Town would look like and buy a building plot. It was formally adopted by Edinburgh Town Council in July 1767, and later that year presented to King George III (1738–1820). Craig soon had plan made into a print and copies were sold by bookshops and from his own home at the foot of Edinburgh's West Bow. In 1767 Craig claimed £50 from his old school for completing his training. Though this was before the formal time he was due to remain under his master the claim indicated that he considered himself free and an architect.

The plan comprised a simple rectilinear arrangement of three parallel main streets (Princes Street, George Street and Queen Street) with a square at each end (St Andrew Square and Charlotte Square). From 1770 to 1781 Craig offered at least three alternative New Town plans which included a large circus at the centre of the development, although this idea was never adopted.

Construction of the New Town began in 1767 with St Andrew's Square in the east, and continued until after Craig's death in 1795, with Charlotte Square being completed in 1800. Craig was responsible only for the layout of the streets, and had no design input into the appearance of most new buildings apart from his the Royal College of Physicians Hall and Library on the south side of George Street (1776–1781). Unbuilt designs included wings to either side of the Hall (1779–1781) and for the new Assembly Rooms on the same side of the street(1781), and for buildings on Lord Ankerville's plot on Princes Street(1777).

Craig is best known as the architect who planned Edinburgh's New Town and surviving examples of his work indicate that he had a profound interest in town planning and urban architecture.

In Edinburgh he designed other new streets and squares including St James Square and Merchant Street from 1772 to 1774. In the next decade he also proposed plans, such as in 1786 he published a pamphlet Plan for Improving the City of Edinburgh, which included proposals for remodelling the Old Town, with squares and crescents along the Royal Mile as his plan for the new south bridge and college. In 1788 he worked for the Merchant Company again planning Hunter Square and Blair Street for a development to incorporate its new meeting hall.Two years later he then designed of a large square for the Edinburgh merchant Robert Hope which was also a development on the south side of Edinburgh. Other town plans included proposed development of Leith, including a long boulevard for Leith Walk linking that burgh with Edinburgh New Town. In terms of actually surveying and building urban housing, in 1772 he prepared a property on the top floor of a tenement on Smith's Land on the north side of the High Street for sale, and in 1779 surveyed a tenement in Libberton Wynd and built a new one on North Bridge Street.

Elsewhere, Craig prepared plans for the development of Glasgow. This was firstly for Trongate's Tontine Hotel from 1781 to 1782. A decade later, he planned the Blythswood estate, to the city's west end, and adjoining lands owned by Glasgow Town Council. The city's town council minutes for 9 August 1792 recorded that " Mr Craig Architect in Edinbugh" was to " plan Meadowflatt for building ground as Mr Craig is employed by Colonel Campbell of Blythswood to make a plan of his building ground in the neighbourhood of Meadowflatt and it will be attended with considerable advantage to have the streets upon the two grounds uniform to and corresponding with each other". While nothing was built until the 19th century, Craig may be responsible for the strict grid layout of the area and thereby responsible for shaping both central Edinburgh and Glasgow.

=== Town council architect ===
Craig never held a salaried post as architect to Edinburgh Town Council or any other Scottish Town Council but he did enjoy the patronage of several Edinburgh Lord Provosts from Gilbert Laurie in 1767 to David Steuart in 1781, and was employed to work in other towns and cities in Scotland including Dundee and Glasgow. In Dundee he designed the new church in 1769 which later became St Andrew's Church, and his work in Glasgow took place from 1781 to 1792.

But, it was for Edinburgh Town Council that he worked the longest. Remembering that this Town Council oversaw the New Town's planning and building meant that Craig frequently presented plans to Lord Provosts and its committees for approval. Such presentations included those for the New Town plan leading to the final authorized plan, and feuing plan, of 1767. These were followed by the circus plan variants of 1770, 1774 and 1780.

Despite not being adopted, Craig retained the confidence of the magistrates and merchants who dominated it. For example, in 1774 the Merchant Company of Edinburgh asked Craig to plan it a new street, south of the Old Town's Cowgate. To advertise it for development, Craig proposed a facades of its buildings.

Following the New Town, the Town Council asked Craig to plan the Town its Observatory on Calton hill from 1775 to 1776 and he was then contracted to build it.

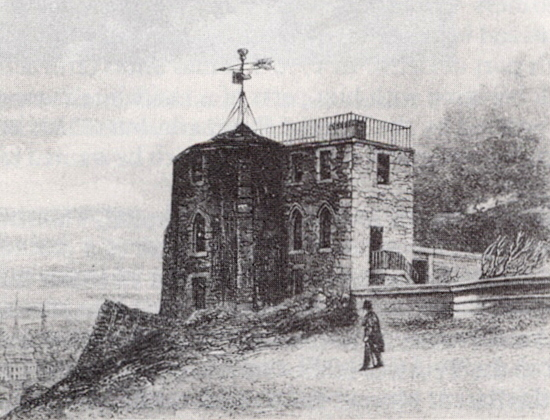
Observatory House in 1792

The new City Observatory on Calton Hill had a gothic tower, now known as Observatory House, which was the only part to be completed before money ran out in 1777. The rest was finally finished in 1792, although this too was replaced, by William Henry Playfair (1790–1857) in 1818.

In 1777 Craig was then asked to plan the refurbishment of the New Church St Giles' Cathedral, and entered the competition to plan Leith Ballast Quay. He was initially chosen to build the quay but was replaced by mason, William Jamieson, son of his former master in the incorporation of wrights and masons. He also in this year planned the funerary monument for Lord Provost Alexander Kincaid intended.

The New Church work kept Craig busy from 1780 and 1781. In these years, he also prepared plans for the proposed new Bridewell, new Edinburgh College classrooms and oversaw the building of Leith Gun Battery Leith where he had design control over the building elevations but not over technical aspects of the fort. The main gate and guard house remain, although the rest of the fort was demolished in the 1950s.

Such public architecture projects were commonly funded by Edinburgh Town Council working in partnership with national government. For examples, the New Church and Leith Gun Battery were partially funded by government grants. Other projects, such as the Inverkeithing Lazaretto in 1771, Royal Botanical Gardens from 1774 to 1782, and May Island Lighthouse in 1786 were all also partially funded through national government and its agencies.

=== Physicians' Hall ===
Politicians aside, another significant source of patronage and friendship Craig enjoyed was from academic professionals including physicians, lawyers, professors to gentlemen living in country houses.

The most significant building Craig designed and undertook in the Edinburgh New Town was Hall and Library of the Royal College of Physicians of Edinburgh (1776–1781) on the south side of George Street, directly facing the later church of St Andrews and St George on the opposite side of the Street. In 1775 former College President Sir Alexander Dick of Prestonfield expressed his approval of the college's choice of Craig as the architect of its long-awaited new Hall. This was not first time that Craig had worked with physicians. Whilst in London in 1767 and 1768, he worked with Sir John Pringle (1707–1782) to present his New Town plan to King George III, then in 1772 in Edinburgh he planned the development of Robertson's Close for Edinburgh Royal Infirmary.

For the Physicians' Hall, Craig worked closely with William Cullen (1710–1790) to agree his contract and then present drawings and proposals for the Hall's enlargement to the Town Council from 1776 to 1780. Over this period of time, Craig also worked with other physicians in the college including Joseph Black (1728–1799) and John Robison (1739–1805) for the Calton Hill Observatory, John Hope (1725–1786), the botanist, for the Botanical Gardens and President Alexander Monro (1733–1817) to hand the hall to the college to use.

The rising cost of the building, partially due to wage strikes by journeymen in 1778 and 1779, led to disagreements between the college and Craig. It was never completed to the architect's satisfaction lacking it balustrade and statues on the exterior. Once built, the college considered offering it as the New Town Assembly Rooms for rent to recover costs, but decided to move in. By 1843 it was found to be inconvenient and was demolished that year, to be replaced by a banking hall by David Rhind (1808–1883).

From 1774 to 1782 Craig worked on the Botanical Gardens which was the on Leith Walk. He produced plans for its entrance, greenhouses, gardener's cottage and several monuments. In 1778, he also oversaw the construction of Robert Adam's plan for the monument to Carl Linnaeus.

=== Lawyers ===
Elsewhere in Edinburgh, from 1778 to 1779 Craig planned the new hall of the Writers to the Signet, which had they been adopted, would have given the architect a new building project to follow immediately on from the Physicians Hall. He had some friends and patrons among lawyers, including enjoying the confidence of one of the judges of the New Town plan, Lord Kames, and was an occasional social acquaintance with celebrated lawyer, James Boswell (1740–1795). Another prominent lawyer who was a patron was Robert Gray, Procurator Fiscal of Edinburgh. Craig prepared a site plan for him bearing the title, "Plan of Mr Gray's property designed by James Craig". It is undated but was once situated on Leith Walk nearby St James Square, which Craig also designed. In fact, such was the proximity of the house and square that Gray and the square's developer, the writer, Walter Ferguson, faced one another in the Court of Session in 1775 and again in 1791. These developments, including the plan Craig prepared for Leith Walk, which is again undated, shows that the architect was prepared to plan out new developments in and near Edinburgh. Lawyers Craig knew through their interests in property development such as, James Jollie, and representing architects and tradesmen in court, such as John Eiston, held land by the Walk which Craig's plan noted.

Other less well known lawyers with whom he worked included property lawyers Walter Ferguson, James McQueen, in legal disputes, John Eiston and financing loans William McEwan and Samuel Watson. He continued to prepare layouts for new developments, including St James Square, to the east of the New Town, in 1773. Most of the square was demolished in the 1950s to make way for the St. James Centre shopping and office complex. Later, Craig prepared plans for new classrooms for the College of Edinburgh in 1781. The room was for Alexander Tytler (1747–1784), Professor of Universal History, and Allan Maconochie (1748–1816), Professor of Public Law.

=== Church architecture ===
Given Craig's own family link with the Presbyterian Church and Greyfriars Church in Edinburgh, he can be found working as an architect in churches. Such work was also a route to be considered for national government patronage via its close contact with the Assembly. In fact, his New Town plans showed new churches were a constantly in his thoughts, and the presence of Alexander Webster (1708–1784) on the project's administrative committees meant that the architect often worked closely with the Minister. But, it was in 1769 that he planned a new church for Dundee. Also north of the Firth of Forth, from 1773 to 1775, Craig planned to refurbish St Salvator's and St Leonard's College Chapels in St Andrews. He worked on the former.

Meanwhile, in 1775 he planned and built a funerary monument for John Fullarton of Carberry inside St Michael's church, where Alexander Carlyle (1722–1805) was its Minister Inveresk.

From 1775 to 1776, he planned the new seating plan for Kinghorn Parish Church in Fife; an exercise which he then returned to for the Edinburgh New Church in 1777. This New Church refurbishment would also have meant working with its Minister, Hugh Blair (1718–1800), who was also Professor of Rhetoric and Belles Lettres at Edinburgh College. Given his connection with Dr Carlyle, and James Thomson, Blair may have warmed to Craig's obvious interests in literature and education with the architect drawn to the Moderate party of the Church of Scotland. As if to illustrate his commitment to Scottish literature, in 1788 Craig worked with Professor William Richardson (1743–1814) of Glasgow College and other Glaswegians and local me to erect a monument commemorating George Buchanan (1506–1582) at Killearn. Craig could not afford to subscribe money but offered to plan it for free. It was a large obelisk and won his wide media coverage and acclaim100-foot (30 m).

In later years, Craig prepared plans for new seating for South Leith Church from 1789 and 1793. In 1791, the architect claimed payment for plans he had made for Edinburgh's St Cuthbert's Church. The precise date of this work remains unknown but they probably related to work there from either 1773 to 1775, or in 1789 when a new steeple was put up.

=== Engineering projects ===
James Craig worked on some engineering projects, which was a consequence of his work as an architect and the demand for improvements for trade, transport and industry. The Edinburgh north and south bridge projects have already been mentioned, and from 1777 to 1779 he and John Adam inspected building work by the north bridge for the Dean of Guild Court. Other work undertaken in 1777 which touched upon engineering included the Leith Ballast Quay. However, most of Craig's engineering projects appear to have proposed in the 1780s. Another bridge project he enquired about was the Bridge of Dun over the Esk for Montrose Town Council. Correspondence between the architect and Town Council's clerk was exchanged between 1783 and 1784. Other projects north of the Forth was Craig's survey and plan of May Island Lighthouse in 1786 for the newly established Chamber of Commerce. It decided against using Craig's proposed plans because there was no precedent for them. Later, Craig also proposed an improved Kirkcadly Harbour in 1788.

=== Country houses ===
Although Craig is best known for his urban architecture, he did also work on some country houses belonging to prestigious clients. Among these were proposed improvements to Mountstuart House for Earl Bute, for which Craig surveyed, and made plans from 1769 to 1770. Later, he also surveyed and planned Dalkeith Palace for the Duke of Buccleuch (1746–1812) in 1776, and in 1785 he surveyed and proposed improvements for Callender House which the businessman William Forbes of Callendar(1756–1823) had purchased. Although undated, Craig also worked at Hopetoun House to plan a new farm on its estate.

Smaller scale projects for country houses included providing an elevation of Mountquhanie House in Fife in 1770 for John Gillespie, and from 1774 to 1775 Craig provided Noel Hill, 1st Lord Berwick, with a drawing of Tern Hall in Shropshire at a time when Hill proposed to convert it into Attingham Hall. This remains Craig's only known English house project although he travelled between England and Scotland many times.

== Grave ==
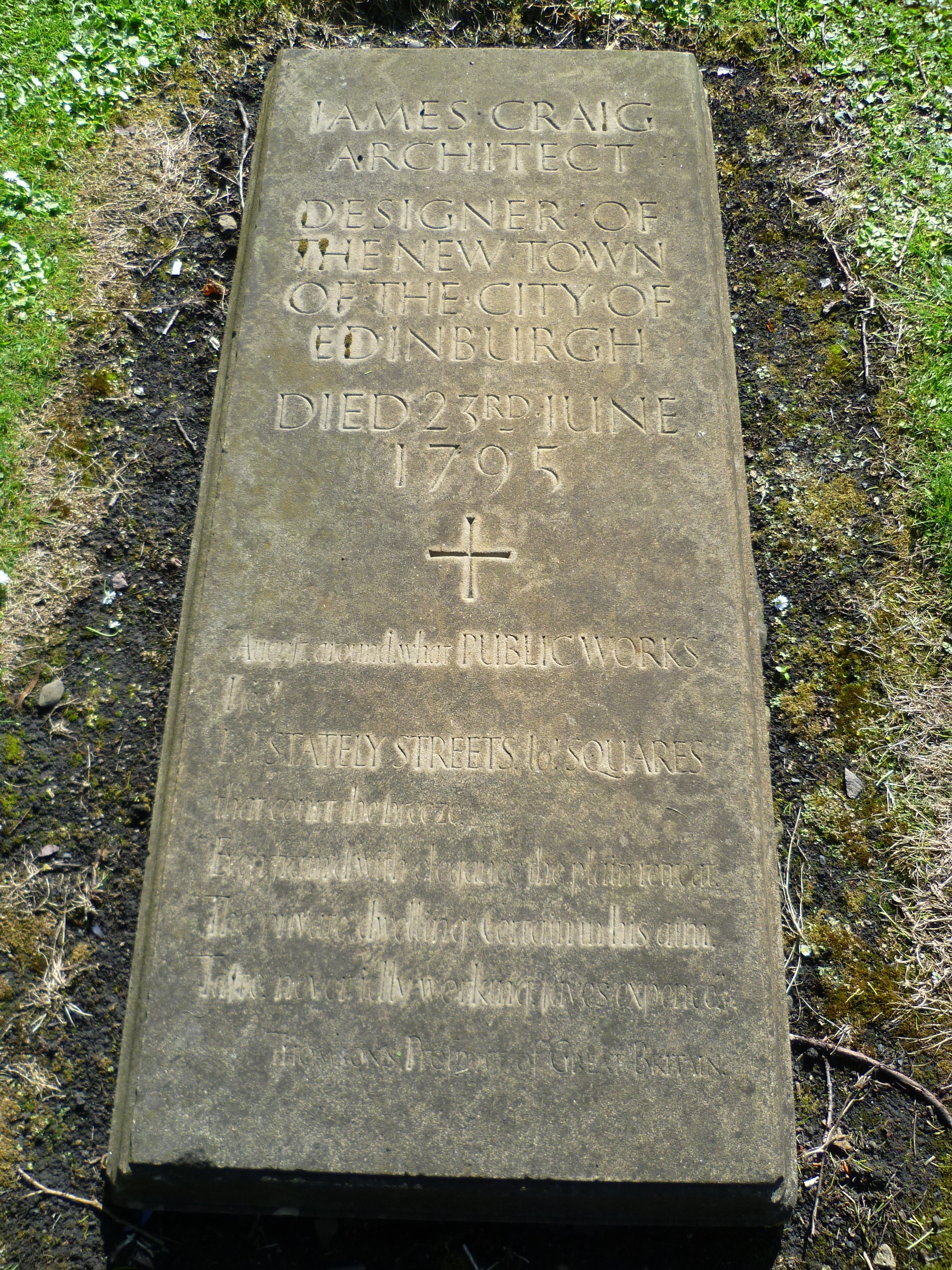
Grave of James Craig in Greyfriars Kirkyard

Craig died at his house at West Bow of consumption (tuberculosis) in 1795. He was buried in the Craig family plot in northmost section of Greyfriars Kirkyard. At the time gravestones were only permitted on the perimeter wall of Greyfriars so no stone was permitted (a stone was later added). No record of who attended his funeral has been found but his death was widely reported in the British press typically commenting that the architect of the New Town and nephew of James Thomson has died. These facts were commonly reported again in subsequent press reports running into the next century.

He died in debt and his goods and books, drawings and equipment were sold at auction to pay creditors in the same year, with their matters for finally settled three years later. Craig was not the only architect or tradesman to have faced financial difficulties, but the commissary court's inventories of his possessions give a fascinating insight into his life and work. No copies of Coernelius Elliot's auction catalogues of Craig's goods and drawings are known to have survived.

Craig was never able to fully capitalise on his success as the architect of the New Town. The management of the project did not lie with him, or any architect, but with Edinburgh Town Council. After 1767, and due to meeting its own financial commitments, the magistrates favoured builders rather than architects. Other causes of frustration were equally also out of his hands and these included political changes within Edinburgh Town Council. Given Craig's heyday was in the 1770s when Sir Lawrence Dundas (1712–1781) dominated Edinburgh, the fall of the Baronet from power after 1781, and the rise of the new regime under Henry Dundas (1742–1811) and the Duke of Buccleuch gave new architects and more builders opportunities to impress the city's leaders. By then, Craig had a reputation for being expensive, as per the Physicians Hall and Observatory, and headstrong in his criticism, as some of his existing letters indicate.

By 1782, his letters to his banker, and confidante, Sir William Forbes (1739–1806), indicate both his frustration at exclusion from work and need to raise money through loans. This need led him to raise loans from lawyers, merchants and others some of whom are listed by the commissary court in 1795. Fatally, such was his inability to replay loans quickly that he had his bank account arrested. For on 16 September 1791 the Town Council Alexander Dawson, a teller in the Royal Bank of Scotland, stopped Craig being paid £350 for work done for the city. The Commissary court records of 1795 indicate Craig had borrowed money from Dawson in 1786. This incident shows that he may have borrowed even more. Had the architect been able to keep his account and receive payment then he may have died without debt. Later critical reviews of his ability as an architect may have different as most focus on his shortcomings as a businessman. To date there is only one published assessment of his drawings or approach to design from sketch to final measured drawing.

If the first half of his career was a period when he did most in Edinburgh, the second half, from 1782 on, shows Craig moving around the country more. In 1787 he even wrote to James Boswell to enquire about moving to work in London. Despite being prepared to travel to work, his financial difficulties led to more frequent appearances in Edinburgh's courts either chasing unpaid bills or being chased for his own debts. Soon, it appears that cash in hand work was the best form of payment for Craig as his debtors circled his bank accounts. In theory, Craig offered Edinburgh town plans featuring circuses, an octagon, a crescent and squares. They were all features which broke what he himself called the "monotony of the straight line". Ironically, it is the grid plan of the New Town for which he is best known. The inventiveness of his town planning matched that of his plans for the Writers' Court and May Island Lighthouse and give reason for why he was known for ingenuity.

Craig was buried in the Craig family plot. It was unmarked. The family was not known for its wealth and on death James' family line ended. He did, however, give it some fame from his work as an architect. Despite his occasional quarrelsome correspondence, commonly caused by non-payment or refusal to adhere to advice, Craig did have friends and allies. Dr William Cullen, Dugald Stewart (1753–1828), Lord Kames, Sir Alexander Dick of Prestonfield, Dr John Hope, James Boswell, Alexander Adam (1741–1809) and many more can be found on good terms with him and after death Craig's reputation as a being a respectable or eminent architect was not tarnished by his debts as when media reports appeared his work and relationship to Thomson was remembered. Legacies of his career today include monuments such as the Fullarton (Inveresk Church) and Buchanan monument (Killearn) as well as the New Town plans of Edinburgh and Glasgow where the grid of streets contrasts Craig's own interests in introducing circuses, octagons and other features to break the pattern up. James Begg was also his draughtsman and pupil who later became the architect of Edinburgh's Gayfield Square.

Due to complex bans on monuments in Greyfriars' churchyard (not lifted until the late 19th century) the grave was only marked in the 1930s, then being done as part of half a dozen new memorials to notable persons by the Saltire Society. Subsequent celebrations of Craig and his work have been undertaken in Edinburgh through temporary museum exhibitions in 1967 and 1995, displaying his portrait and surviving mathematical instruments at Huntly House/Museum of Edinburgh, and numerous publications on the New Town with one, James Craig, 1744–1795, The Ingenious Architect of the New Town of Edinburgh (Mercat Press, 1995) being the only book of essays focussing on the architect.
