= List of restaurants in Scotland =

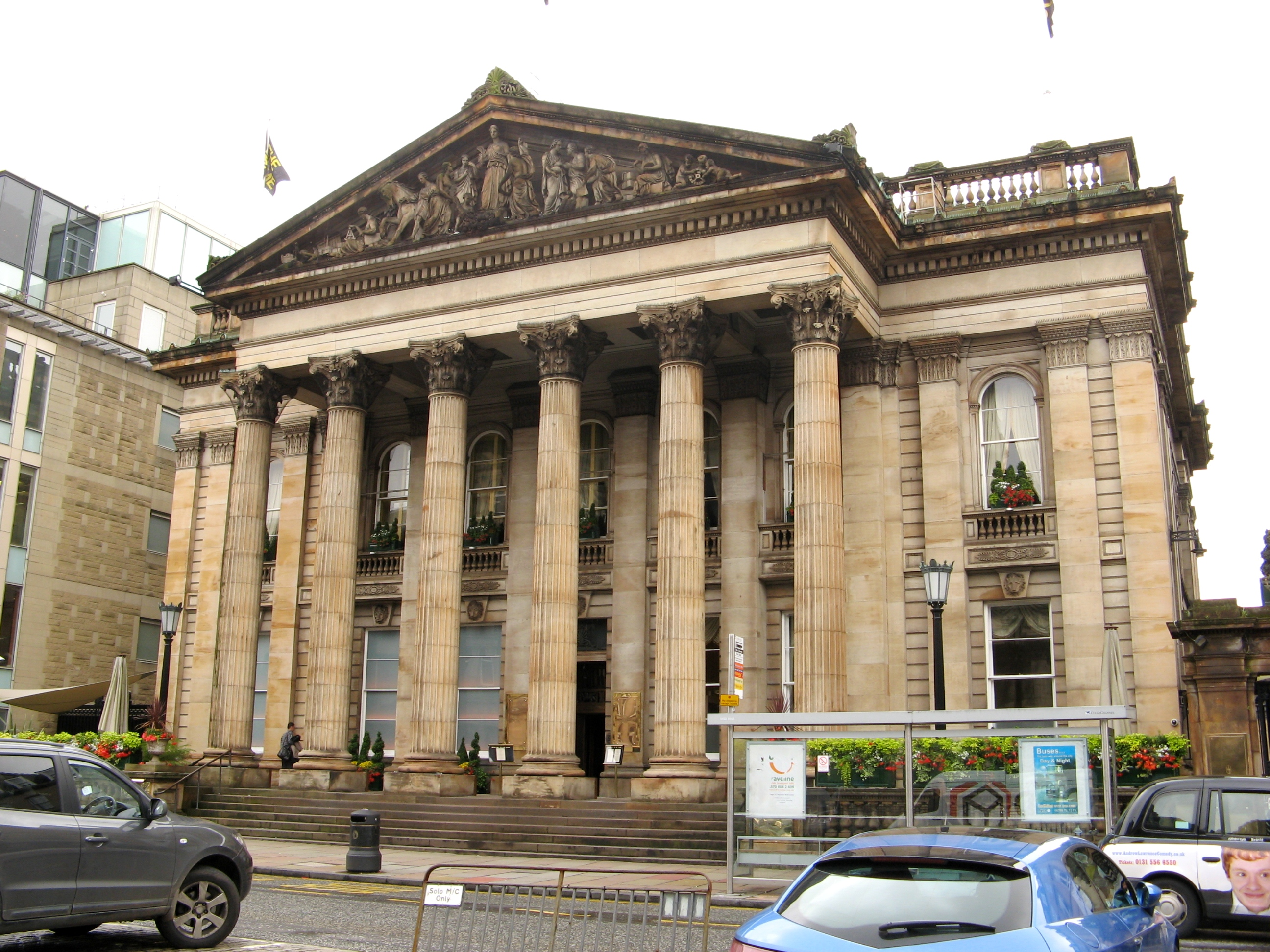
The Dome in Edinburgh

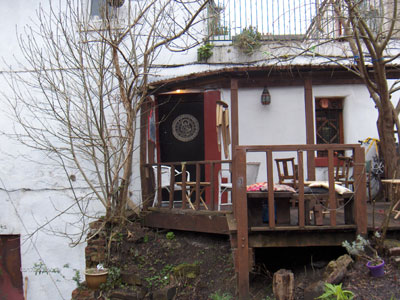
Outside area and entrance of Tchai-Ovna in West End Glasgow

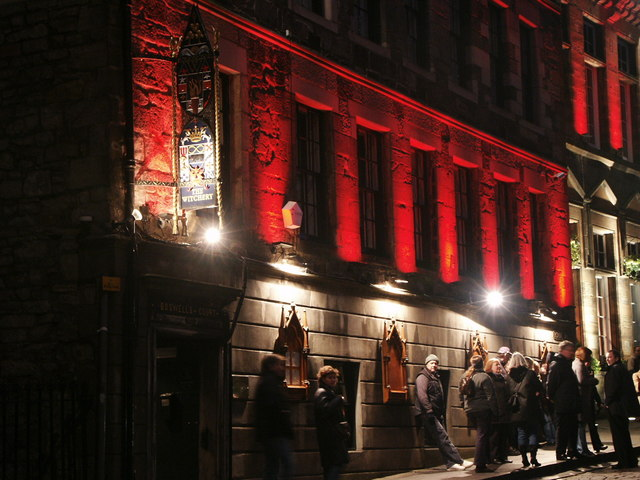
The Witchery by the Castle at night, 2007

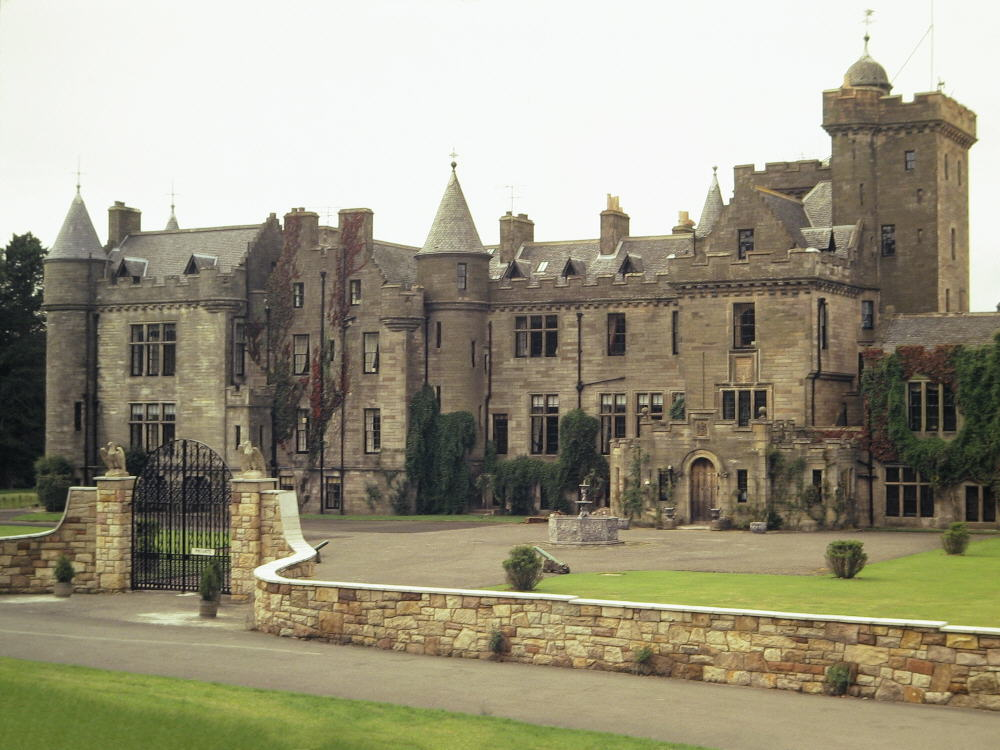
The south-east facade at Glenapp Castle

This is a list of notable restaurants in Scotland.

== Restaurants in Scotland ==
=== Edinburgh ===
- The Dome, Edinburgh – Building in Edinburgh, Scotland
- The Kitchin – restaurant in Edinburgh, Scotland, UK
- Prestonfield House – house, now hotel in Prestonfield, Edinburgh, Scotland, UK
- The Witchery by the Castle – Restaurant, bed and breakfast

=== Glasgow ===
- One Devonshire Gardens – hotel in Glasgow City, Scotland, UK
- Pink Peacock
- Tchai-Ovna – tea house in Glasgow City, Scotland, UK
- Menu by Gordan Ramsay, Ibrox Stadium, Glasgow City, Scotland, UK

=== Elsewhere ===
- The Ashvale – Scottish restaurant
- Ballachulish House – restaurant located in Ballachulish, Highland, Scotland, UK
- Baxters – Scottish food manufacturer
- Champany Inn – human settlement in Falkirk, Scotland, UK
- Glenapp Castle – Luxury hotel, South Ayrshire, Scotland
- HR Bradfords – Chain of bakeries operating throughout the Greater Glasgow area of Scotland
- Knockinaam Lodge – restaurant in Dumfries and Galloway, Scotland, UK
- The Three Chimneys – restaurant in Highland, Scotland, UK
- Tony Macaroni – Chain of Italian restaurants

=== Former restaurants ===
- Amaryllis (Glasgow)

== See also ==
- Scottish cuisine
- List of companies of Scotland
- List of Michelin-starred restaurants in Scotland
- Lists of restaurants
