= Hearts Are Trumps =

Hearts Are Trumps may refer to:

- Hearts are Trumps (painting), an 1872 painting by John Everett Millais
- Hearts Are Trumps (1920 American film), a silent drama by Rex Ingram
- Hearts Are Trumps (1920 German film), a silent film by E. A. Dupont
- Hearts Are Trumps (1934 film), a German comedy by Carl Boese

== See also ==
- Darts Are Trumps, a 1938 British comedy film by Maclean Rogers
- Hearts Are Thumps, a 1937 Our Gang short
