= Craigentinny =

Suburb of Edinburgh, Scotland

Coordinates: 55°57′31.94″N 3°7′58.07″W

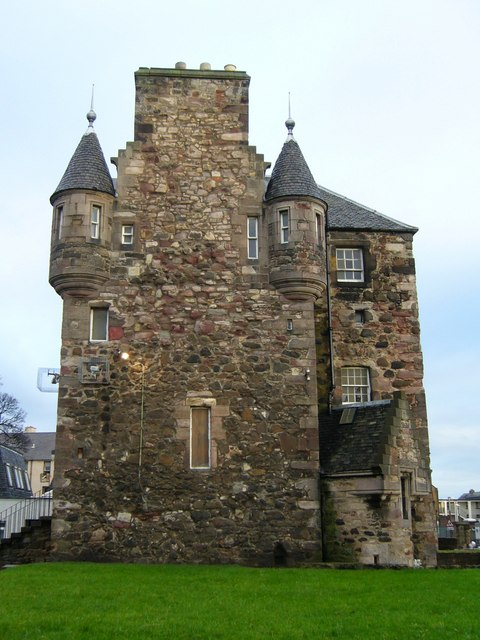
- Craigentinny House

- Location within the City of Edinburgh council area Location within Scotland
- OS grid reference: NT291749
- Council area: City of Edinburgh
- Country: Scotland
- Sovereign state: United Kingdom
- Post town: EDINBURGH
- Postcode district: EH7
- Dialling code: 0131
- Police: Scotland
- Fire: Scottish
- Ambulance: Scottish
- UK Parliament: Edinburgh East
- Scottish Parliament: Edinburgh Eastern

Craigentinny is a suburb in the north-east of Edinburgh, Scotland, east of Restalrig and Lochend.

Its name may be a corruption of the Gaelic Creag an t-Sionnaich, meaning "the fox's rock".

== History ==
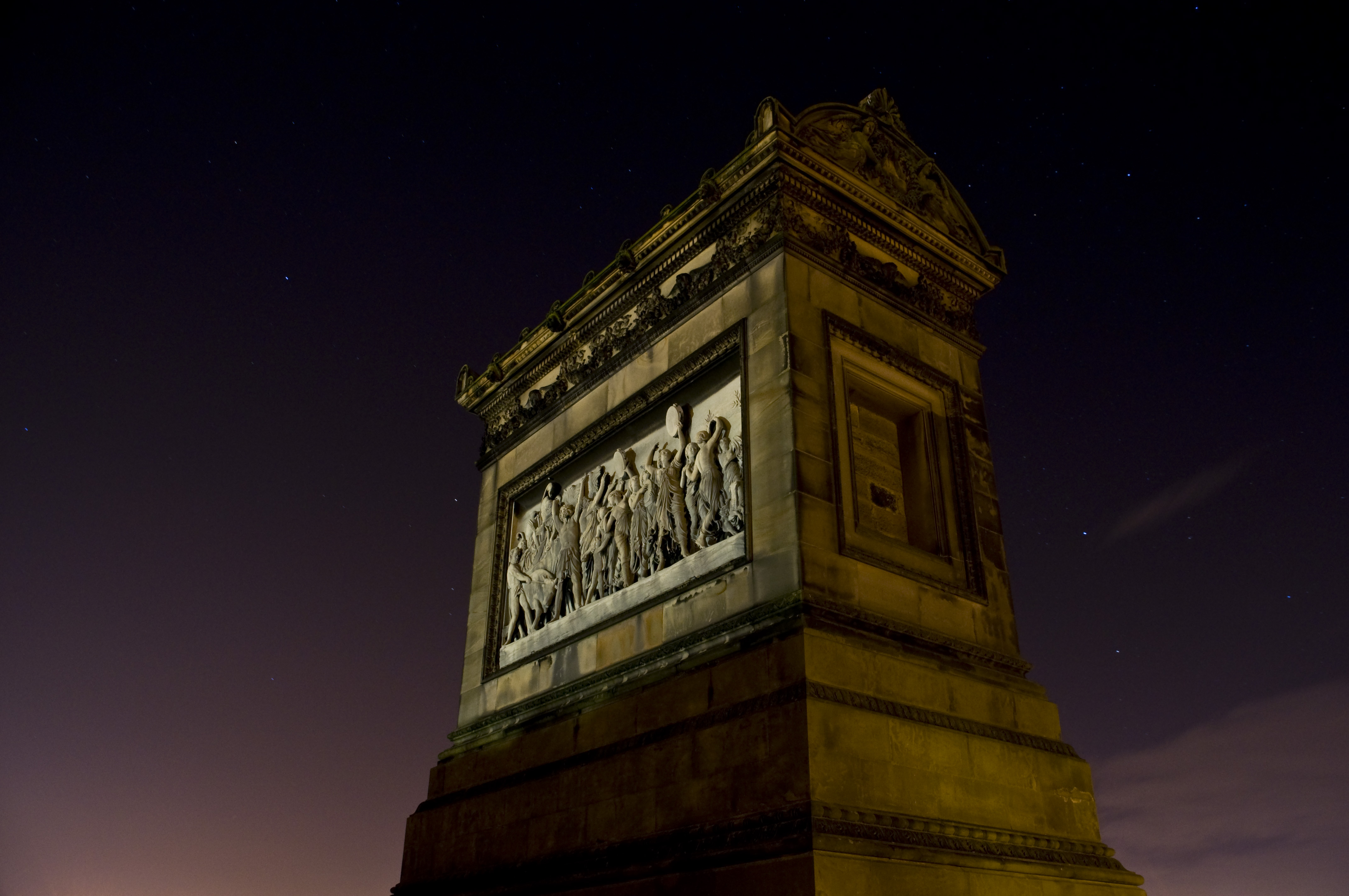
Final resting place of William Henry Miller, designed by David Rhind, with bas relief sculptures by Alfred Gatley, this on the south side depicting "The Song of Moses and Miriam"

Previously moorland, the first major house was built shortly after 1604. This house, Craigentinny, gives its name to the wider area. It was built by James Nisbet of the Nisbet family associated more strongly with the Dean area of the city, as the occupants of Dean House. The land was bought from the Logan family of Restalrig. Through the Nisbet family it passed to John Nisbet, Lord Dirleton around 1680. Through Lord Dirleton it passed to the Scott-Nisbets. After the death of John Scott-Nisbet in 1765 it was bought by a William Miller (1722–99), a wealthy seedsman and Quaker, living on the Canongate, who already owned property in the Craigentinny and Fillyside areas. William's only surviving son was with his third wife Martha Rowson: William Henry Miller (MP) (1789-1848) (whose mausoleum lies nearby). Around 1850 it was remodelled by David Rhind for the Marsh sisters who had inherited the house. It later passed to Samuel Christy, a distant relation (who changed his name to Christie-Miller e.g. Christiemiller Avenue). The house was largely inhabited by caretakers until it was purchased in 1937 by the Council and converted to serve as a community centre, said to be the first within a Scottish council estate.

In 1932-4 the Council developed part of the area in two main phases with over 800 houses and a block of six shops, mainly in three-storey tenements by Ebenezer James MacRae and his team. The latter parts of the layout were by George Clark Robb with individual tenements by architects Andrew MacCulloch, John Mailler Scott and others. The remaining estate was laid out with private bungalows largely by James Miller (no relation) and Hepburn Brothers.

The area contains churches and schools from the 1930s, including, Craigentinny Primary School on Loaning Road which was designed by Ebenezer James MacRae's team (1934), and St Christopher's Church which is at the junction of Craigentinny Road and Craigentinny Avenue and was designed by James MacLachlan (1934).

The most distinctive and unique structure in the area is the Craigentinny Marbles, a mausoleum to William Henry Miller (1789–1848) by David Rhind with bas reliefs by Sir Alfred Gatley. The monument was subsumed by bungalows in the 1930s and now stands on Craigentinny Crescent.

== Other features ==
Craigentinny Golf Course is an 18-hole par 67 course lying on the north edge of the district close to Seafield and the Firth of Forth.

Craigentinny train maintenance depot is located in the area.
