= Walter Armstrong (art historian) =

British art historian, author and gallery director

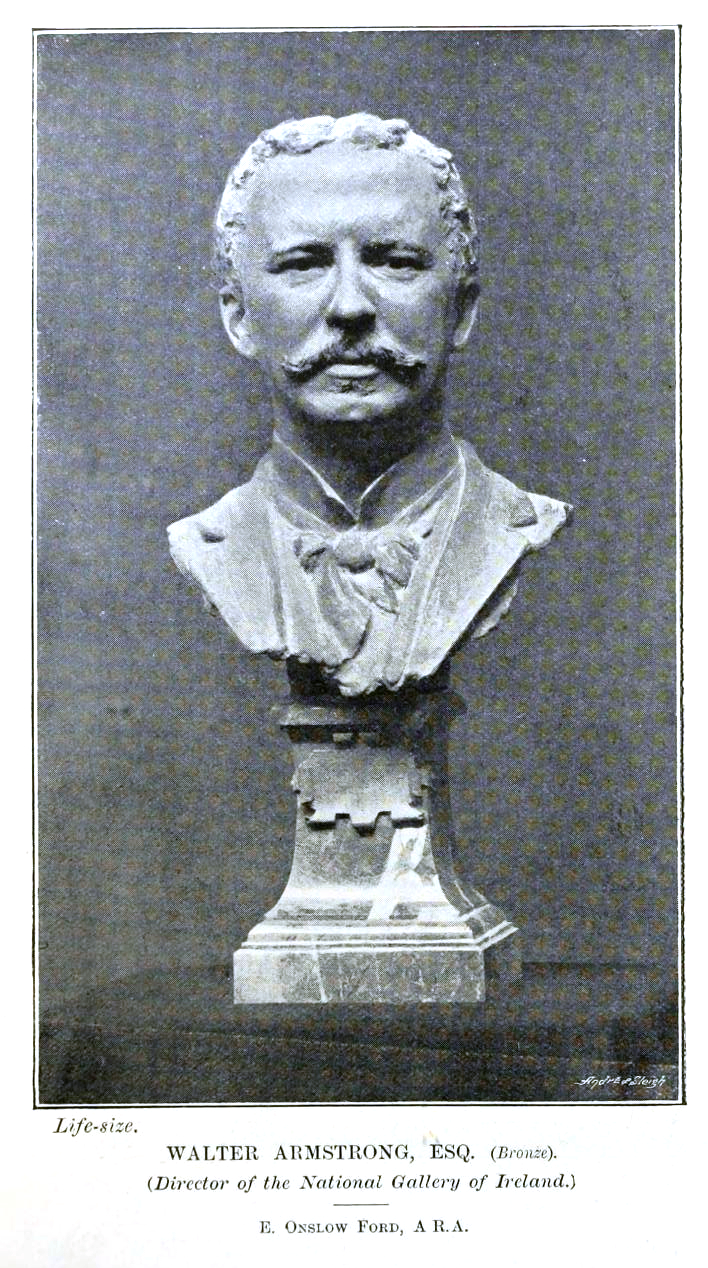
- Bust by Edward Onslow Ford
- Born: 7 February 1850; Roxburghshire, Scotland
- Died: 8 August 1918 (aged 68); London, England
- Resting place: Lebanon Circle at Highgate Cemetery (West)

Sir Walter Armstrong (7 February 1850 Hawick, Roxburghshire – 8 August 1918 London) was a British art historian, author, and gallery director.

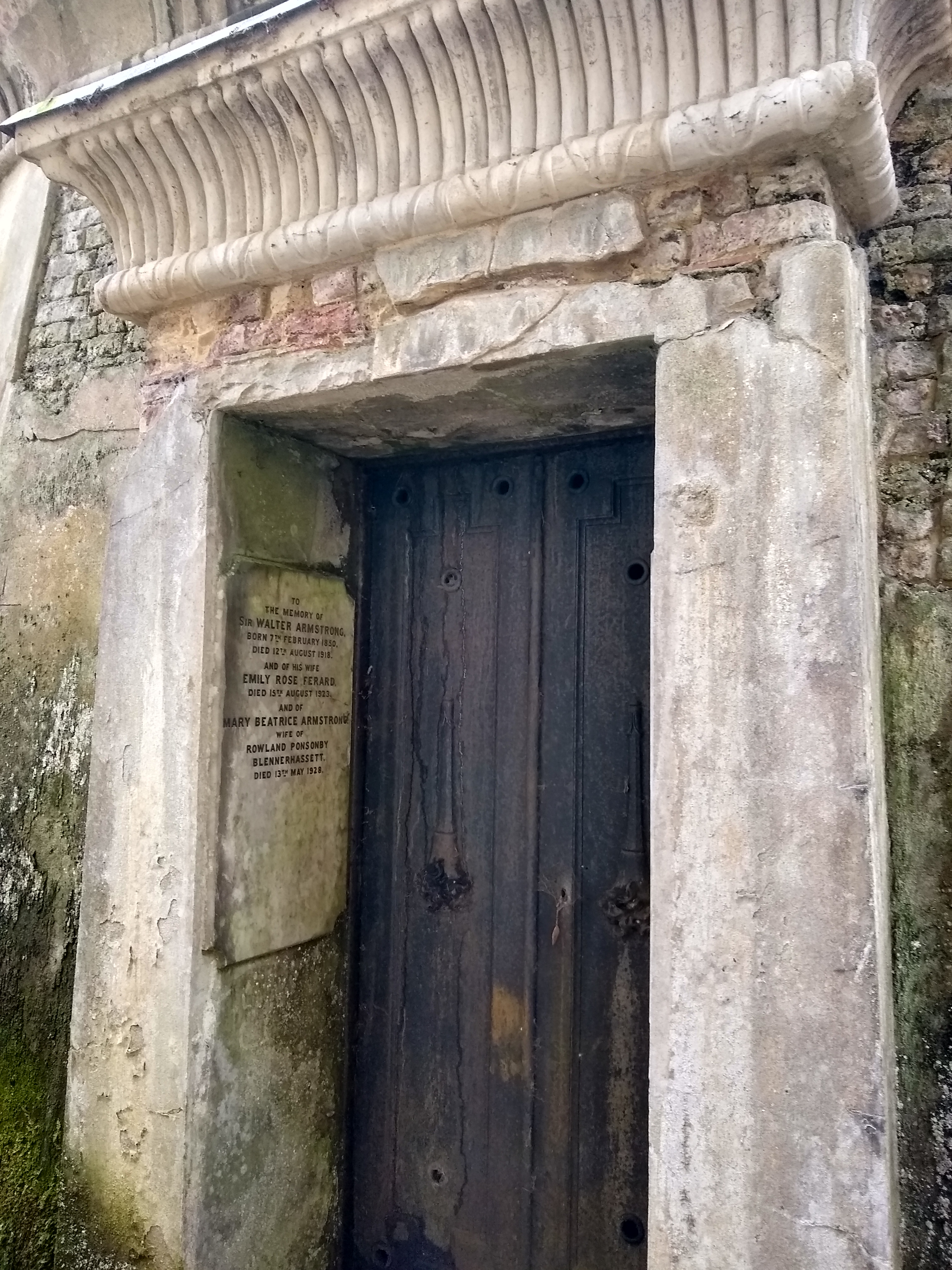
The family vault of Sir Walter Armstrong in the Lebanon Circle at Highgate Cemetery

== Early life ==
Armstrong was born on 7 February 1850 in Roxburghshire, Scotland, the eldest son of Walter Armstrong of Hawick and Mary Graham. He had one brother and three sisters. He was educated at Harrow and Exeter College, Oxford, graduating with a BA in 1873.

== Career ==
He taught in art schools in Dresden, London and Paris. For 10 years after 1880 he was art critic to several newspapers, such as the Pall Mall Gazette, the Manchester Guardian, and the old Manchester Examiner. He made his mark in the art world, and was consulted by students and collectors, becoming an authority especially on Dutch 17th-century and English 18th-century painting. Several fine collections, including of Samuel Joseph, were mainly formed under his advice.

In 1892, he succeeded the late Henry Doyle as Director of the National Gallery of Ireland (NGI) in Dublin, which his predecessor had reorganised and developed. Armstrong remained as director for over 20 years, his services recognised by a knighthood in 1899 from Earl Cadogan. During his directorship, a 15 room extension designed by Thomas Manly Deane was opened in 1903, and oversaw the acquisition of numerous important works and collections. He also wrote the first catalogue of the collections that was practical, well-designed and academic.

During his time in Dublin he wrote many books, among which his stately volumes on Sir Joshua Reynolds, Gainsborough, and Raeburn were the chief, that held a position of authority for many years afterwards. Earlier and later he wrote columns on men so various as Peter De Wint, Velasquez, and Sir Thomas Lawrence, and a book of Notes on the National Gallery, containing many suggestive criticisms.

He retired from the NGI in 1914. He was a close friend of Walter Osborne, and wrote his entry for the Oxford Dictionary of National Biography.

== Personal life and death ==
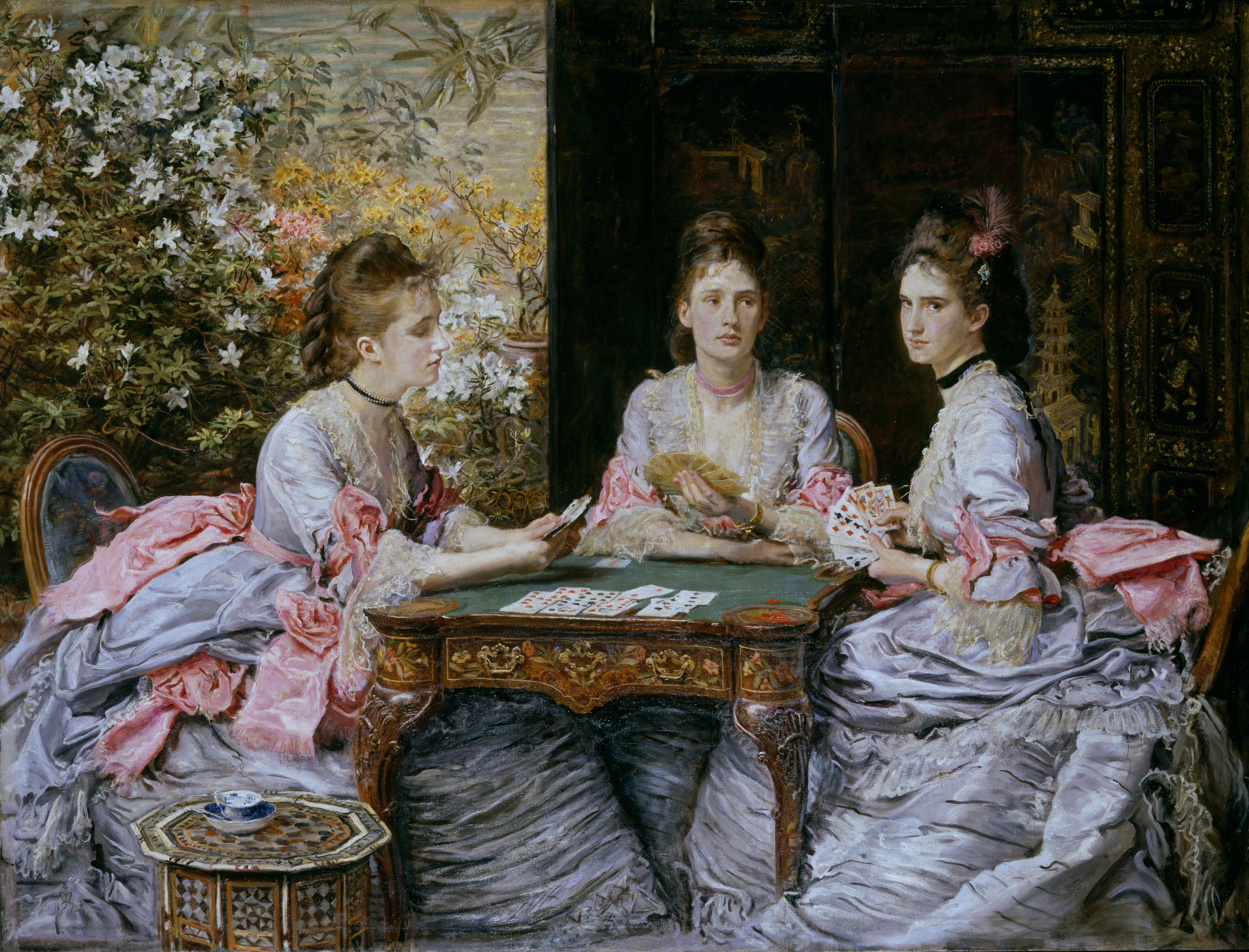
Hearts are Trumps by John Everett Millais (1872) depicts Armstrong's three sisters.

In 1873 he married Emily Rose Ferard of Ascot Place, Berkshire. The couple had two sons and three daughters. He died of angina pectoris at his home, 63 Carlisle Mansions, in Westminster on 12 August 1918. and is buried in a family vault on the Lebanon Circle at Highgate Cemetery (West). Also interred in the family vault is the Armstrong's sister Mary Beatrice who married Rowland Ponsonby Blennerhassett in 1876.

== Selected publications ==
- The art of William Quiller Orchardson. The Portfolio artistic monographs ;[no. 14]. Seeley and Co.; Macmillan and Co. 1895.
- Gainsborough and his place in English art. Heinemann; Scribner. 1898.
- Art in Great Britain and Ireland. 1900.
- Sir Joshua Reynolds, first president of the Royal Academy. W. Heinemann; C. Scribner's Sons. 1900.
- Sir Henry Raeburn. W. Heinemann; Dodd, Mead & company. 1901.
- Turner. T. Agnew; C. Scribner's. 1902.
- The Peel collection and the Dutch school of painting. The Portfolio artistic monographs ;[no. 45]. Seeley and co., limited; E.P. Dutton & co. 1904.
- Lawrence. C. Scribner's. 1913.
