= Rayburn =

Rayburn may refer to:

== Places ==
=== United States ===
==== Municipalities ====
- Rayburn, Alabama
- Rayburn, Texas
- Rayburn, West Virginia
- Rayburn Township, Pennsylvania

==== Structures ====
- Rayburn House Office Building, a Congressional building

== Arts, entertainment, and media ==
- Rayburn House, the fictional beachside inn owned by the Rayburn family on the Netflix series Bloodline

== Brands ==
- Rayburn range, a stove cooker from AGA

== See also ==
- Raeburn
- Deanna Raybourn
