= Tchai-Ovna =

Coordinates: 55.873°N 4.282°W

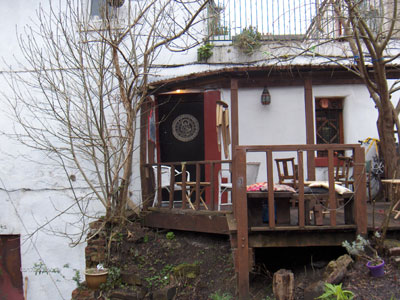
Outside area (now closed) and former entrance to Tchai-Ovna, which now has a new entrance

Tchai-Ovna Fine Teas, based in the Glue Factory building in North Glasgow, is a speciality loose leaf tea shop and blenders which retails a wide variety of tea online, including many of its own homemade recipes, and wholesales to other businesses. It occasionally hosts events, such as tea tasting sessions, and also exists as a pop-up tea shop, serving at events, markets and festivals around Scotland and Northern England.

Tchai-Ovna previously existed from 2000-2023 as a well-known teahouse and music venue in the West End of Glasgow, where it served a large selection of teas from all over the world, as well as vegetarian and vegan foodstuffs. It was a popular spot for music, poetry readings and dramatic performances, and an arts exhibition space. It hosted a diverse variety of musical events, with performances from singer-songwriters, jazz musicians, world music artists and many others. Tchai-Ovna's name and bohemian atmosphere were inspired by the teahouses (čajovny) of the Czech Republic.

Tchai-Ovna's owners and supporters were heavily involved in the campaign against a new development of luxury flats on Otago Lane, home of their old teahouse, which would have completely changed the character of a unique area of Glasgow and forced the closure of several popular businesses. A community campaign to save Otago Lane attempted to retain the teahouse. This campaign was ultimately unsuccessful and the venue closed in mid-2023. However, Tchai-Ovna tea products can still be purchased online and by arrangement in person from their current home at the Glue Factory.

== See also ==
- List of restaurants in Scotland
