= Craigentinny Marbles =

Monument and mausoleum in Edinburgh, Scotland

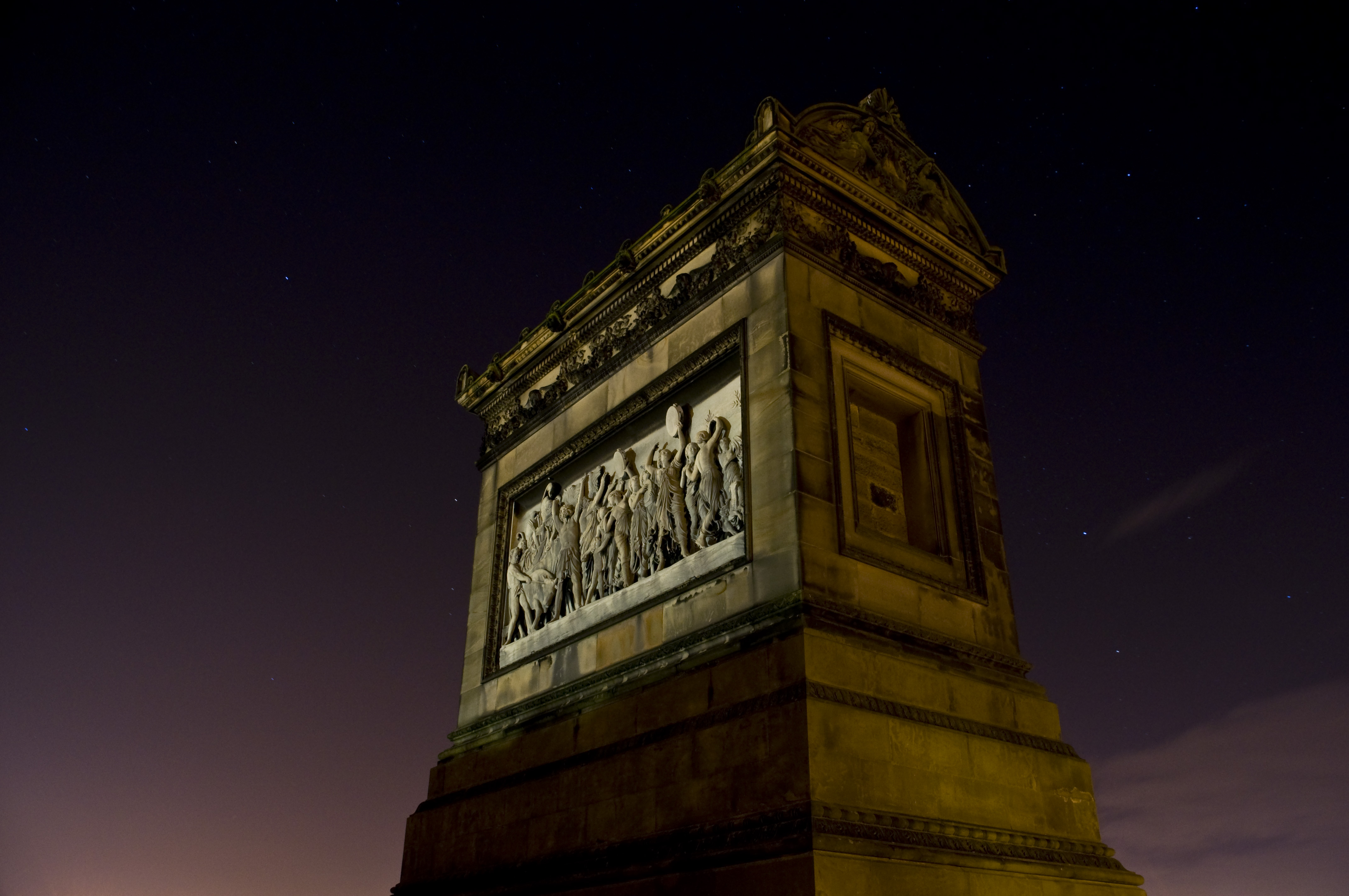
- Location: Edinburgh, Scotland
- Coordinates: 55°57′26″N 3°08′14″W
- Beginning date: 1848
- Completion date: 1856

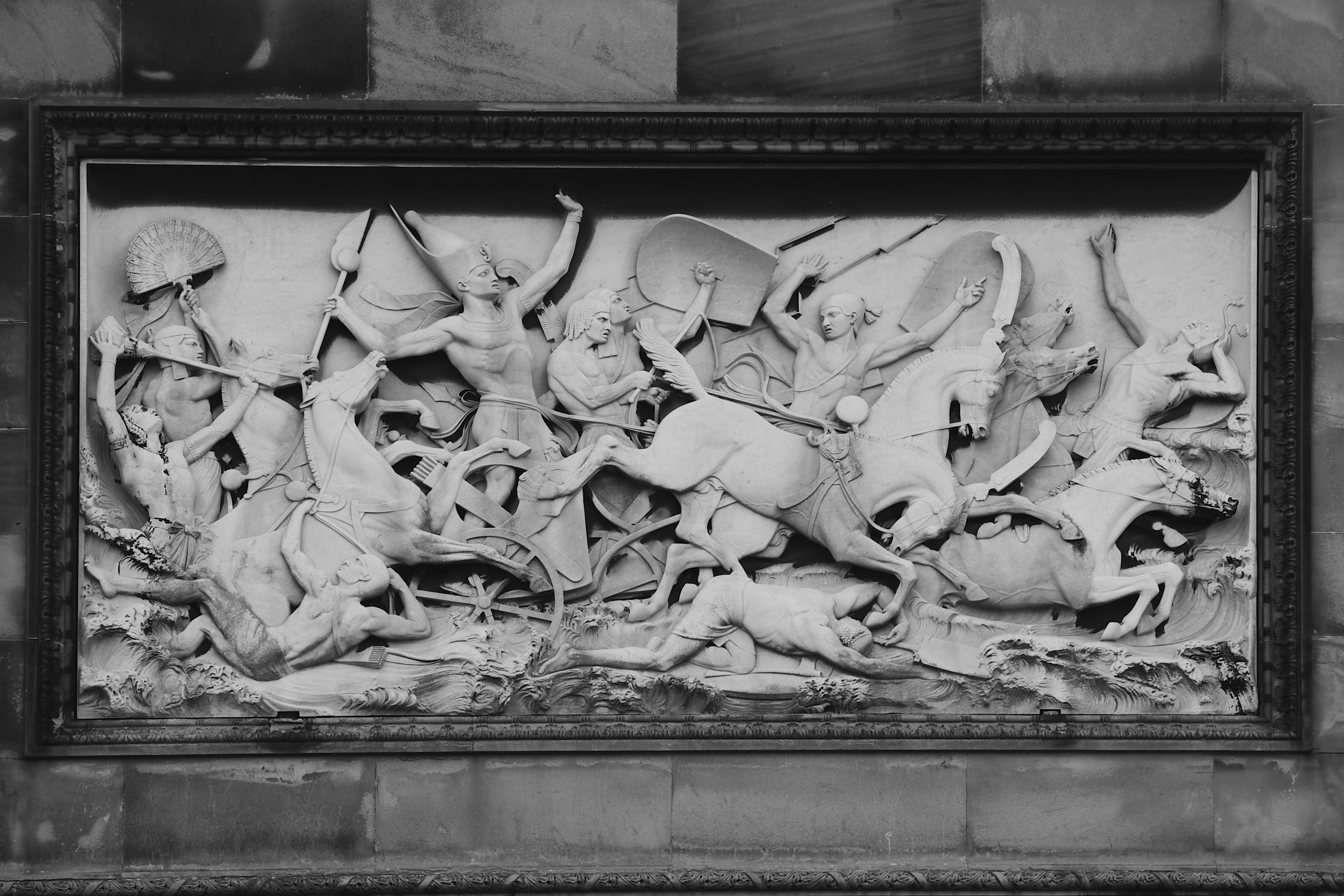
The Overthrow of the Pharaoh in the Red Sea: frieze by Alfred Gatley

The Craigentinny Marbles is the mausoleum of William Henry Miller (1789–1848), a wealthy landowner and Member of Parliament for Newcastle-under-Lyme, who retired to his estate at Craigentinny after losing his parliamentary seat in 1841. Miller was childless, so upon his death in 1848, the execution of his will fell to a distant relative, Samuel Christy. The will contained instructions to bury Miller's body in a 20-foot-deep pit above which, The Scotsman reported, would be built a monument "in commemoration of the private virtues of the deceased, for, as a public character, he was unknown." £20,000 was allocated for construction. Although the monument would originally have been a solitary structure in a moorland half a mile east of Miller's house, it is now somewhat incongruously surrounded by 1930s bungalows on Craigentinny Crescent.

The mausoleum itself was designed by David Rhind and completed in 1856, with two bas relief sculptures by Alfred Gatley depicting part of the biblical narrative of the Exodus added later. The relief on the north face, 'The Overthrow of Pharaoh in the Red Sea', shows the destruction of Ramesses II's army during the crossing of the Red Sea. The relief on the south face, 'The Song of Moses and Miriam', depicts the Israelites singing a song of celebration for their escape and the destruction of the Egyptian army. The 'Pharaoh' bas-relief was finished in time to be displayed at the 1862 International Exhibition in London, but the 'Song' bas-relief was completed just before Gatley's death from dysentery in 1863.

The monument was designated a Category A listed building in 1970.
