= William Forbes of Callendar =

British businessman (1743–1815)

Sir William Forbes, 1st of Callendar
- Portrait by Raeburn – hangs in Callendar House
- Born: 12 August 1743; Aberdeen, Aberdeenshire
- Died: 21 June 1815 (aged 71); Callander, Stirling, Scotland
- Occupation: Landowner
- Spouse(s): Margaret McAdam, Agnes Chalmers
- Children: William, John, Katherine, Jessie, Agnes

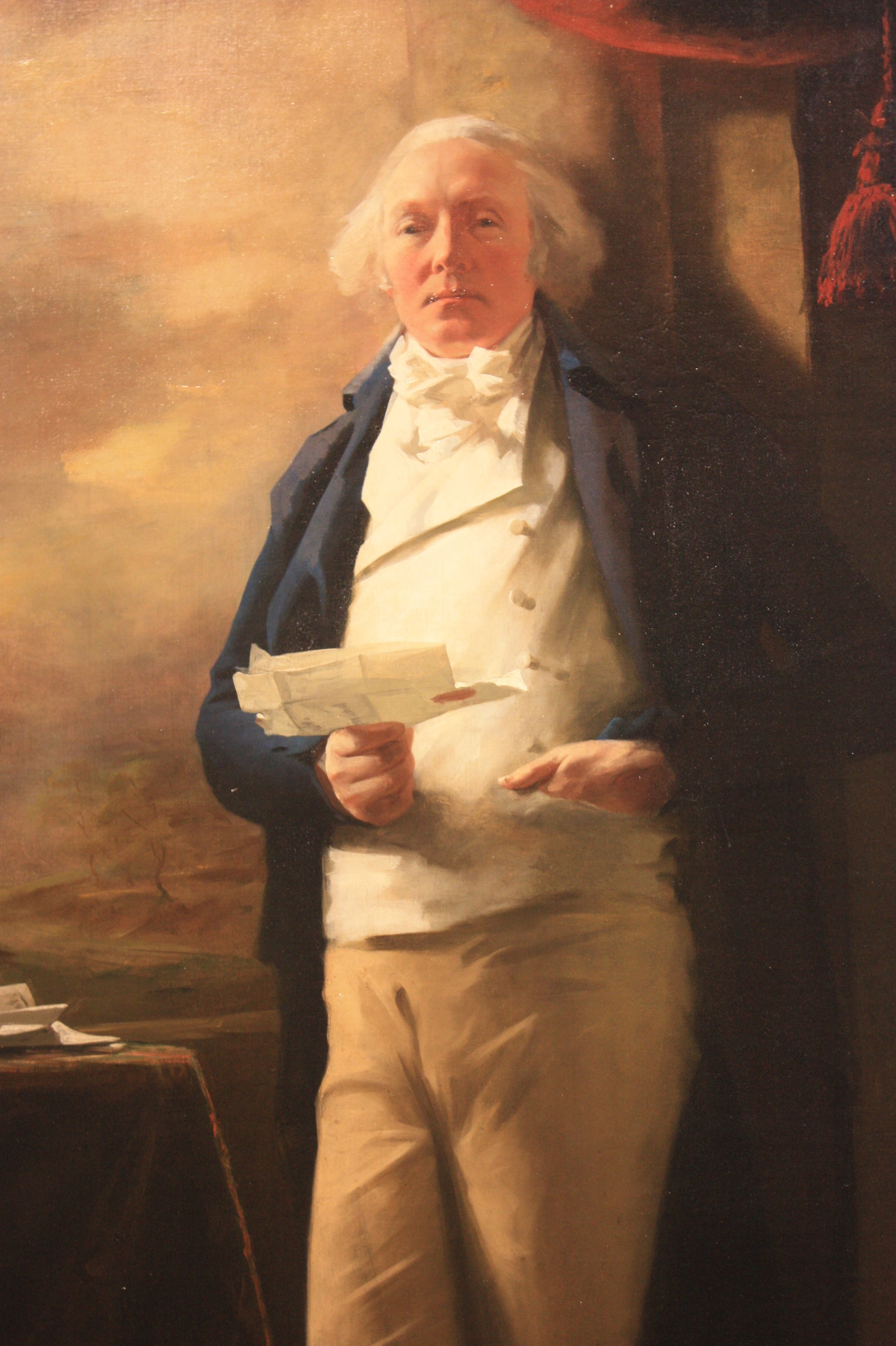
William Forbes of Callendar by Sir Henry Raeburn (detail) 1798

Sir William Forbes of Callendar (1743–1815) was a prosperous coppersmith and landowner who lived in Callendar House in Falkirk, Scotland.

== Biography ==
Forbes was a self-made man. The son of an Aberdeen merchant, he began work as a coppersmith and won a government contract to sheath ships' hulls in copper. With the fortune he made (equivalent to over $1 billion in today's terms), he purchased the estates of Callendar and Linlithgow near Falkirk, which had been forfeited by the Jacobite Earl of Linlithgow after the 1715 Jacobite rising. He bought the estates at auction and is said to have astounded bystanders by producing a banknote for £100,000, specially printed for the occasion, at the age of just 40. At the time he was the greatest landowner in the county, with some of the largest collected lands in Scotland.He was not popular with local people, but nevertheless his family retained great influence over the area for two centuries.

As a successful coppersmith from Aberdeen, among other products, he manufactured sugar boiling pans and rum stills for export to Jamaica. Connecting him and his business to the profits of slavery in the Caribbean.

Wishing to set himself up as a 'landed gentleman', William purchased further vast estates in Ayrshire, Earlstoun, Kirkcudbrightshire and Dumfriesshire. He spent ten years making improvements to Callendar House, dividing his time between the house and London. He gave orders for the complete renovation and refurnishing of the entire house, adding a new wing and ripping out old rooms. He added the various turrets and exterior decoration which give the house its chateau-like appearance today. Although William preferred the newest fashion (and purchased the best furniture and household goods from makers in London and Edinburgh) he did not spend money recklessly, ordering the new servants' wing to be furnished 'in the cheapest way'.

His first wife was Margaret McAdam, daughter of John McAdam of Craigengillan. She did not keep well and was sent to Madeira for her health's sake. There she died, at the early age of 28, in March 1793. Her gravestone, English marble, sent from London, can be seen in the English Cemetery, Funchal. Forbes remarried in 1806 Agnes Chalmers, daughter of John Chalmers of Old Machar in Aberdeen. This union produced two sons and three daughters. The Forbes household settled down after William's marriage and he began to spend more time in Callendar House and give his brother David greater control of the business in London.

In 1794, aged 51, he retired to become a full-time landowner, rejecting the idea of employing a factor trained in the needs of estate management and elected to manage the 8,000-acre (32 km^{2}) estates himself. His first son William, 2nd of Callendar, went on to become Conservative MP for Stirlingshire.

Forbes' descendants sold Callendar House in the 1960s and are listed in Burke's Landed Gentry.
