= John Boswell (physician) =

Scottish physician

Dr John Boswell
- portrait by William Millar
- Born: July 12, 1710
- Died: 15 May 1780 (aged 69)
- Citizenship: British
- Education: Leiden University
- Occupation: Physician

John Boswell PRCPE (1710–1780) was a Scottish physician who was Treasurer and President of the Royal College of Physicians of Edinburgh. He lived at Boswell's Court in Edinburgh, which is named after him.

He was the son of James Boswell, the seventh laird of Auchinleck. He studied medicine at Leiden University, graduating in 1736 with a thesis about amber. He was Treasurer of the Royal College of Physicians of Edinburgh from 1748 to 1763 with a break of two years at the end of 1756. He was elected President of the college in 1770.

He died in 1780 and his nephew, the ninth laird and famous biographer James Boswell wrote, "He was a very good scholar, knew a great many things, had an elegant taste, and was very affectionate. But he had no conduct. His money was all gone; and do you know, he was not confined to one woman? He had a strange kind of religion. But, I flatter myself, he will be e'er long, if he is not already, in Heaven."
