= The Dome, Edinburgh =

Building in Edinburgh, Scotland

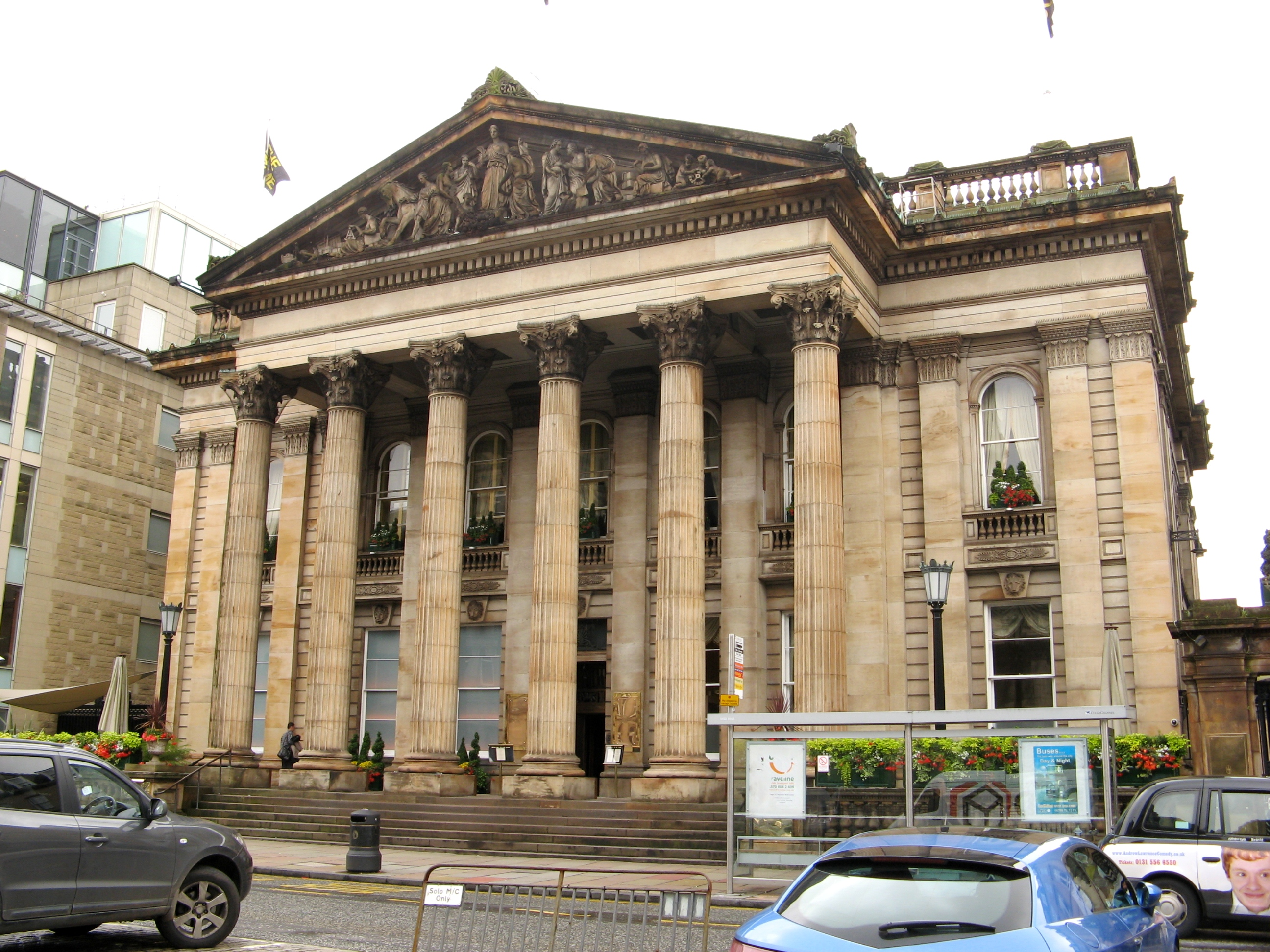
- The Dome, George Street, Edinburgh
- Former names: Commercial Bank of Scotland

General information
- Architectural style: Greco-Roman
- Location: New Town, Scotland
- Coordinates: 55.95346°N 3.19555°W
- Current tenants: Caledonian Heritable
- Year built: c.1840s

Technical details
- Floor count: 2

Design and construction
- Architect: David Rhind

Listed Building – Category A
- Official name: 14 George Street, former Commercial Bank, incorporating boundary walls, railings and balustrades, flanking gateways and pavilions, and lamp standards
- Type: Architectural
- Designated: 13 January 1966
- Reference no.: LB28862

The Dome is a building on George Street in New Town of Edinburgh, Scotland. It currently functions as a bar, restaurant and nightclub, although it was first built as the headquarters of the Commercial Bank of Scotland in 1847. The building was designed by David Rhind in a Graeco-Roman style. It stands on the site of the Physicians' Hall, the offices of the Royal College of Physicians of Edinburgh, which was constructed in the 18th century to designs by James Craig, the planner of the New Town.

The Dome is a category A listed building. The current operating business is Caledonian Heritable, a hotel, bars and restaurant group founded by Portobello born entrepreneur Kevin Doyle (also Archerfield, Ryan's Bar, & co)

== Physicians' Hall ==
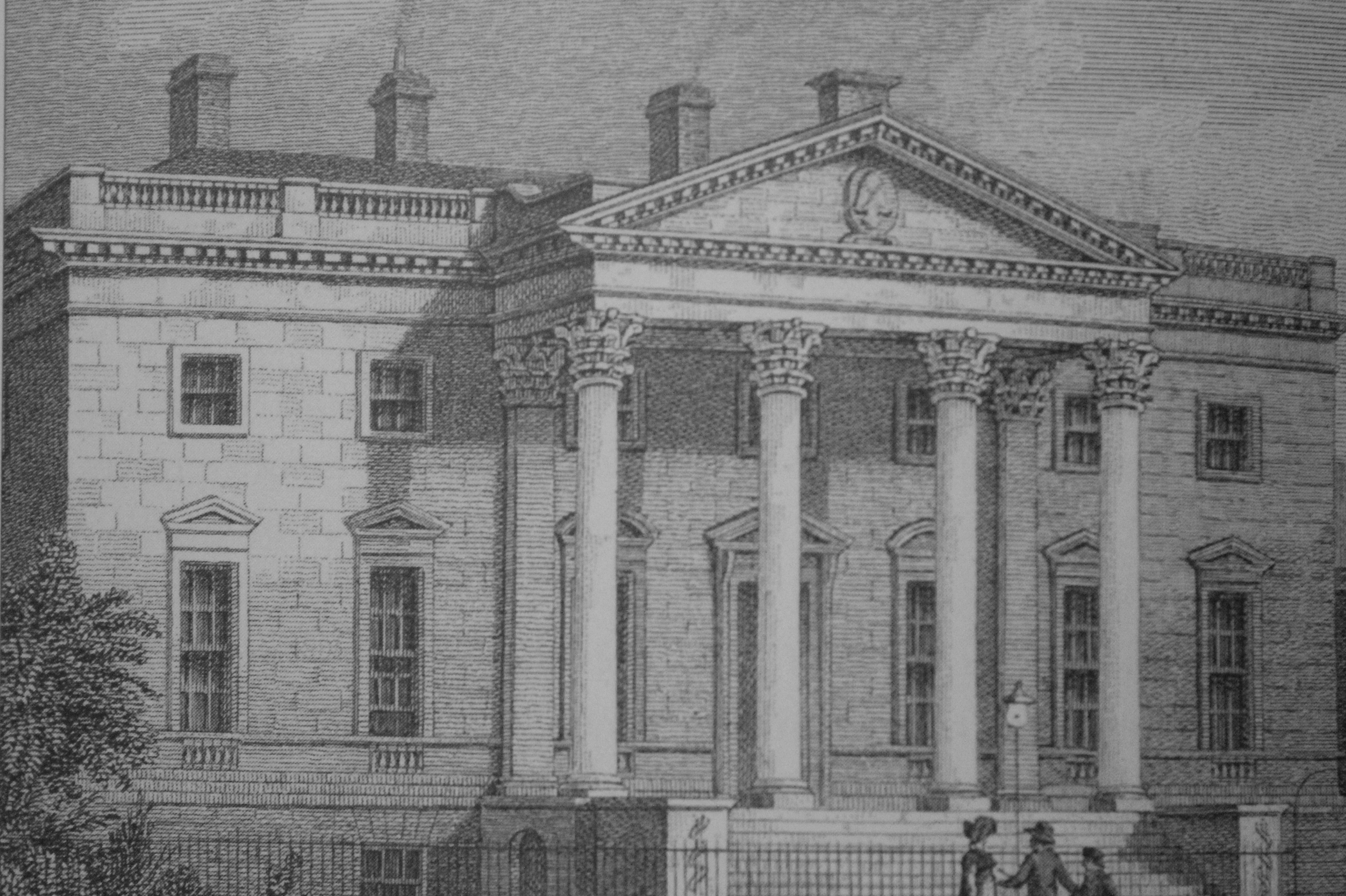
The Physicians Hall on George Street in Edinburgh 1780

The Dome stands on the site of the old Physicians' Hall, by architect James Craig. As the winner of the New Town planning competition in 1766, he received few commissions for individual buildings within his masterplan. However, he did design the Physicians' Hall for the Royal College of Physicians of Edinburgh. This fine building was largely demolished to create the current building, but parts of the frontage appear to be re-used including the fine Corinthian columns.

Aesthetically, the Hall was striking and beautiful to the eye. Its foundation stone was laid in 1776. The building, with an 84-foot-long (26 m) frontage, had a portico supported by four Corinthian columns and gave the College of Physicians a permanent home again after several decades in a building behind the Royal Infirmary on what is now Drummond Street. Unfortunately, the sense of permanence was not achieved because the Hall did not suit the need of the physicians. Since the Hall was built for lecturing purposes both for students and existing physicians, it is said not to have achieved its original goal. Being offered a large sum for the George Street site, the College relocated slightly to the north on Queen Street (and remains there still).

== Outlook on transformation ==
Owned by Scotland's Commercial Bank, a new project by architect David Rhind was on the horizon for the now empty lot. Previous to this architectural movement, the Church was the central structure in terms of financial dedication. Now, money was filtered and dedicated to the construction of banks and commercial property. "This undermined the political power of the old society of landed and established religious interests was now followed by a further acceleration of capitalist-led social and economic transformation". This means that to represent Scotland's more socialist outlook, buildings focused on serving the community as a whole, not just an elite or selective audience.

The Scottish capitalist movement was an architectural turning point in Scotland. "The earlier building types of capitalism were refined and elaborated. Banks and insurance companies built ever more grandiose headquarters and branches in the cities, along with offices for lawyers, shipping firms and land agents; the construction of bank chambers from the 1840s (as with David Rhind's work for the Commercial Bank) constituted one of the biggest ever building campaigns in Scottish cities". To further portray the socialistic thinking, the Commercial Bank's style focused a great deal on unity, a fundamental value of the belief. "The whole is sculptured in a very high style of art, the prevailing feeling of the different groups being in harmony with each other, blending into a whole, and so uniting with the details and general effect of the edifice as to combine the tout ensemble into an interesting and delightful unity". In terms of economic outlook, Scotland's views had changed from Socialistic to Capitalistic.

== Construction of the bank ==
David Rhind saw this perspective of capitalism and traced the idea roots all the way back to Greek society. "From the mid- 1830s and early 1840s, while Thomas Hamilton and Playfair had continued to exploit the potential of explicitly Grecian architecture, William Burn, David Bryce (Burn's partner 1841–1850) and David Rhind had begun to move towards an astylar, Italian palazzo-like classicism for some commercial buildings and club-houses, and a Graeco-Baroque grandeur for others – in both cases, combined with a somewhat Greek sharpness of detail". With this mindset, a classical revival became highly evident in Scottish architecture. "By the end of the 1840s, there developed that aspect of Neoclassical architecture, known as Greco-Roman, whose influence was strongest among Scottish banks".

Rhind embraced these ideas as he started to construct the building which is now called The Dome. "The front of this banking-house, a really magnificent structure, which has been erected in George Street, exhibits a Corinthian hexastyle portico ninety-five feet in width, of great general beauty, and having a bold but not obtrusive projection; the columns of which it is composed, six in number, as the name of its style indicates, are thirty-five feet high, of very graceful proportions, with a happily adapted intercolumniation, and having elegant well-relieved and spiritedly carved capitals". In other words, the building is representative of Doric order and Greek classicism. The windows of are arched and simple, very similar to those designed by Andrea Palladio in the Villa Godi. The front architrave is quite comparable to the Temple of Agrigento.

The sculpture on the portico is by Alexander Handyside Ritchie.

== The Commercial Bank ==
Not only did the Commercial Bank capture ideology of society but it also captured a sense of beauty. In April 1847, The Scotsman wrote, "'the rich and massive architecture of the front', and the interior decoration 'in a style which is not less than gorgeous'". It can be drawn that the interior again resorts back to a classical style with columns and a central dome. David Rhind clearly took advantage of light source, by constructing the dome of glass, as well as giving the building a more modern appeal.

== Present day ==
The Commercial Bank of Scotland, through a series of mergers, is now part of the Royal Bank of Scotland. However, the walls, windows, floors, and dome of the building remain present today.

David Rhind incorporated the use of light by using a glass dome, and made use of space with a large central lobby. Although one of many buildings in a Greek Revival style, The Dome stands unique on George Street with its stunning pediment and long rich history.

== See also ==
- List of restaurants in Scotland

== Bibliography ==
- Cleghorn, George. (1848) Ancient and Modern Art, Historical and Critical. Vol.1, p. 180 (W. Blackwood & Sons) Accessed 28 March 2010.
- Coghill, Hamish. (2005) Lost Edinburgh: Edinburgh's Lost Architectural Heritage. (Edinburgh: Birlinn)
- "New Building of the Commercial Bank in Edinburgh" The Fine Arts' Journal. No.24, Vol.1, p. 383 (17 April 1847) Accessed 28 March 2010.
- Glendinning, Miles; MacInnes, Ranald; MacKechnie, Aonghus. (1996) A History of Scottish Architecture: from the Renaissance to the Present Day. (Edinburgh: Edinburgh University Press) ISBN 978-0-7486-0849-2
