= Knockinaam Lodge =

Coordinates: 54°49′N 5°05′W

- Interactive map of Knockinaam Lodge

Restaurant information
- Head chef: Tyler King
- Rating: {L'Assiette Michelin} (Michelin Guide 2017)
- Location: Portpatrick, Dumfries & Galloway, DG9 9AD, Scotland
- Reservations: Yes
- Website: https://www.knockinaamlodge.com/

Knockinaam Lodge is a historic country house hotel and restaurant situated approximately 3.5 miles (5.6 km) south of Portpatrick, Dumfries & Galloway, Scotland. Originally constructed in 1869 as a hunting lodge, the property occupies a secluded coastal cove overlooking the Irish Sea towards Northern Ireland.

The hotel has ten guest bedrooms, a restaurant awarded three AA Rosettes, and two self-catering lodges within its grounds. It is classified by the AA as a five-star Restaurant with Rooms and is included in the Michelin Guide's hotel selection.

Winston Churchill and General Dwight Eisenhower are said to have planned the D-Day landings here.

== History ==
Knockinaam Lodge was built in 1869 as a hunting lodge for the Hunter-Blair family of Blairquhan, near Maybole in Ayrshire.

During the Second World War, the property was owned by the Orr-Ewing family. According to local accounts, British Prime Minister Winston Churchill and American General Dwight D. Eisenhower met at Knockinaam Lodge in early 1944 during preparations for the Allied invasion of Normandy. Although the reported meeting has become part of the property's history, definitive documentary evidence has not been established.

The lodge is also associated with Lieutenant Commander Malcolm David Wanklyn VC, a decorated Royal Navy submarine commander during the Second World War.

The property was subsequently converted into a country house hotel, becoming particularly well known for its restaurant.

=== Restaurant ===
The restaurant at Knockinaam Lodge held one Michelin star for more than two decades, retaining the distinction until 2015.

The kitchen was led by chef Tony Pierce until his retirement in 2026. Tyler King was then appointed head chef, having previously led the Michelin-starred restaurant Condita in Edinburgh. The restaurant continues to hold three AA Rosettes and serves a tasting menu focused on locally sourced produce.

== Recognition ==
Knockinaam Lodge has received recognition from several British hospitality guides.

In 2024, the property received a César Award from The Good Hotel Guide, being named its Scottish Hotel of the Year.

At the 2026 AA Hospitality Awards, Knockinaam Lodge received the AA Wine Award for Scotland, recognising the quality, organisation and breadth of its wine list.

The property is also included in the Michelin Guide's hotel selection.
