= The Witchery =

Restaurant and hotel in Edinburgh, Scotland

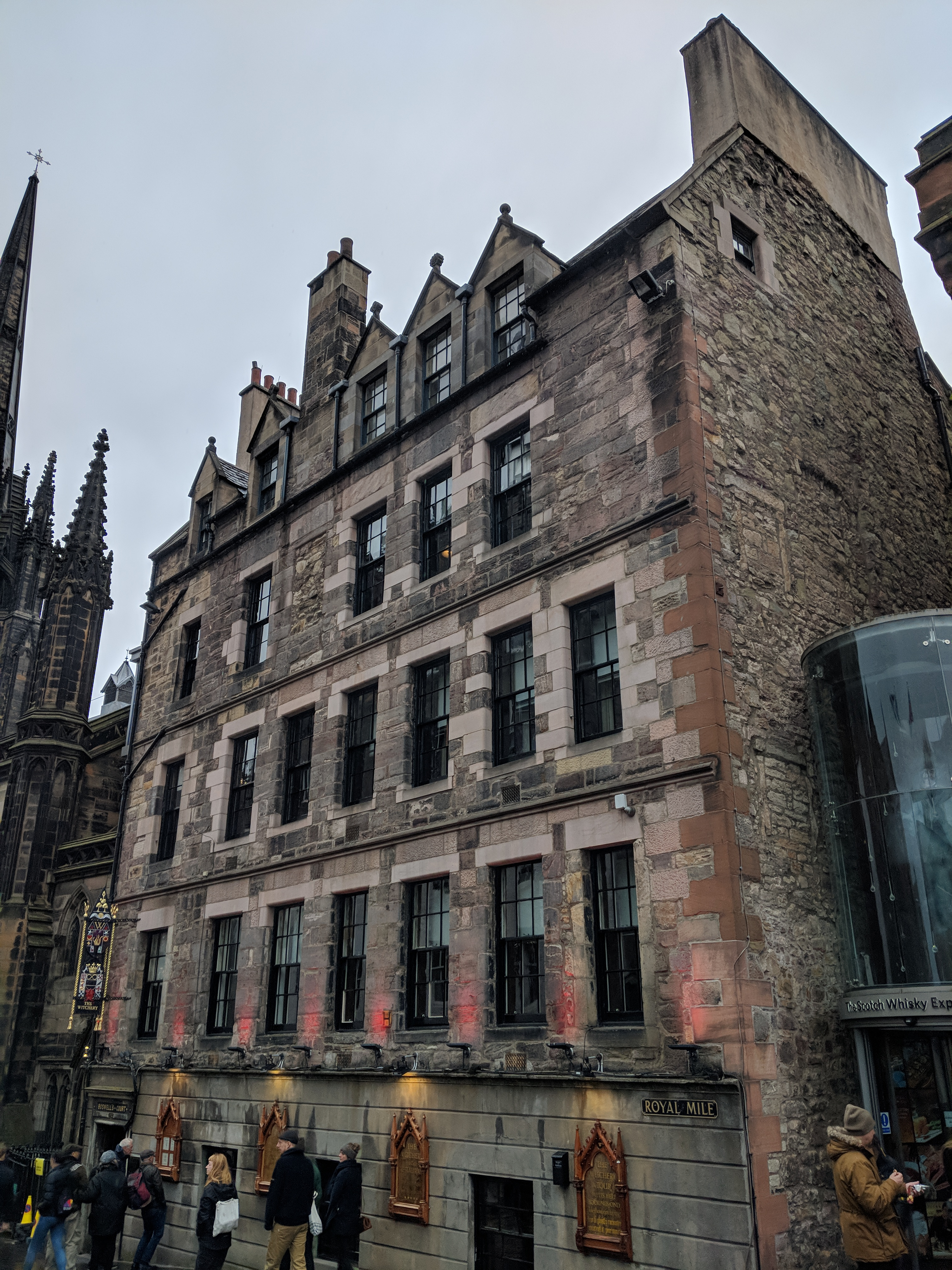
- The Witchery viewed from the Royal Mile

- Location within Edinburgh city centre

Restaurant information
- Established: 1979; 47 years ago
- Owner: James Thomson OBE
- Head chef: Douglas Roberts
- Food type: Scottish cuisine
- Dress code: Smart
- Rating: AA Restaurant with Rooms; AA Rosettes (2026)
- Location: 352 Castlehill, Edinburgh EH1 2NF, Scotland, United Kingdom
- Coordinates: 55.9488°N 3.1956°W
- Seating capacity: 50 (Witchery); 60 (Secret Garden)
- Public transit access: Edinburgh Waverley
- Website: www.thewitchery.com

Listed Building – Category A
- Official name: 352 Castlehill, Boswell Court
- Designated: 14 December 1970
- Reference no.: LB28489

Listed Building – Category B
- Official name: 537 And 539 Castlehill, Jollie's Close, Semple's Close And Sempill House (Part)
- Designated: 14 December 1970
- Reference no.: LB28486

The Witchery (also known as the Witchery by the Castle) is a restaurant on the Royal Mile, Edinburgh, adjacent to the esplanade of Edinburgh Castle. The restaurant was founded in 1979. The name comes from the history of witch burnings in 16th and 17th century Scotland, many of which took place on the nearby Castlehill.

In 1989, the restaurant expanded southward into a new space, the Secret Garden, more than doubling capacity. Since then, the restaurant has added nine luxury hotel suites across two historic listed properties, and operates a nearby shop selling high-end Scottish goods such as tweed, cashmere and whisky.

== History ==
The Witchery restaurant occupies Boswell's Court, a Category A listed building built in 1595 for merchant Thomas Lowthian. It was subsequently named after John Boswell – an eccentric physician who lived there and entertained his nephew James Boswell and Dr Johnson. The building was later used as an office and rectory for the Church of Scotland. The motto ‘O Lord in thee is all my traist’ remains engraved above the entrance from this period.

The site was purchased in 1979 by chef James Thomson. The tenement building had become run-down, and the Royal Mile was generally seen as an insalubrious location. At the time of opening Thomson was 20 years old, becoming Scotland's youngest licensee. At the start there were just three staff but the business has now grown to employ over 70, including several housekeepers, a night porter and 16 chefs.

The Witchery was a key part of the regeneration of Edinburgh's Old Town and became increasingly popular with visitors to the city. Responding to this demand, in 1989, Thomson purchased part of the Castlehill School playground, which lay directly to the south of the existing venue, and converted it into The Secret Garden, an additional restaurant space. Shortly afterwards, the upper floors of the Witchery were renovated into the first five suites, and the venue began to describe itself as a "Restaurant with Rooms".

The style of service at the restaurant has long been influenced by the theatrical. Speaking to The Scotsman newspaper in 2002, Thompson said of the Witchery, "A waiter is not simply employed. He is cast in a role. You have to look at the whole restaurant experience as a whole - like a production". The Witchery maintains an online register of celebrities that have signed their guestbook, which includes Christopher Lloyd, Jack Nicholson, Ralph Fiennes, and Margot Robbie.

In 2003, Thomson purchased a second venue, Prestonfield House, and converted it into a luxury hotel.

The Witchery takes its name from the practice of burning those accused of witchcraft on Castlehill in early modern Scotland, and local folklore holds that the modern restaurant is haunted by a person who was executed in this manner. A contemporary ghost-themed walking tour, the Cadies and Witchery Tours, has met outside the Witchery since 1984. The initiative was designed to bring guests into the restaurant in the quieter winter months.

== The Witchery suites ==
The Witchery operates nine bedroom suites, each with a king-sized bed and furnished in a Gothic style with oak panelling, tapestries and antique features.

The suites are individually named according to their history and placement:

- The Vestry
- The Sempil, which is named after the Sempil family who purchased the property in 1743
- The Old Rectory
- The Library, which is notable for a hidden door located in its bookcase
- The Inner Sanctum
- The Heriot, which overlooks George Heriot's School, where Witchery founder Thomson studied
- The Guardroom, which is lined with Scots Guards uniforms
- The Armoury
- The Turret, which is within a third-floor stone turret

Notable people who have stayed in the Witchery's suites include Andrew Lloyd Webber and Catherine Zeta-Jones.

== The Witchery Shop ==
In 2024, marking the 45th anniversary of the restaurant's establishment, the Witchery opened a themed luxury goods store in a Georgian property at 539 Castlehill. The store stocks tweed, cashmere, leather goods, and food and drink in keeping with the theme of the restaurant. A secret passage in the store leads to a hidden tasting room, where drinks can be served.

At launch, the shop offered a limited edition Witchery-branded Scotch whisky from Teaninich, and the Leather Collection, a set of bespoke suitcases by Edinburgh designer Simon Harvey-Potts.

== See also ==
- Prestonfield House
- Jesse Dunford Wood, a notable chef trained at The Witchery
- List of restaurants in Scotland
