= Hearts are Trumps (painting) =

Painting by John Everett Millais

Hearts Are Trumps
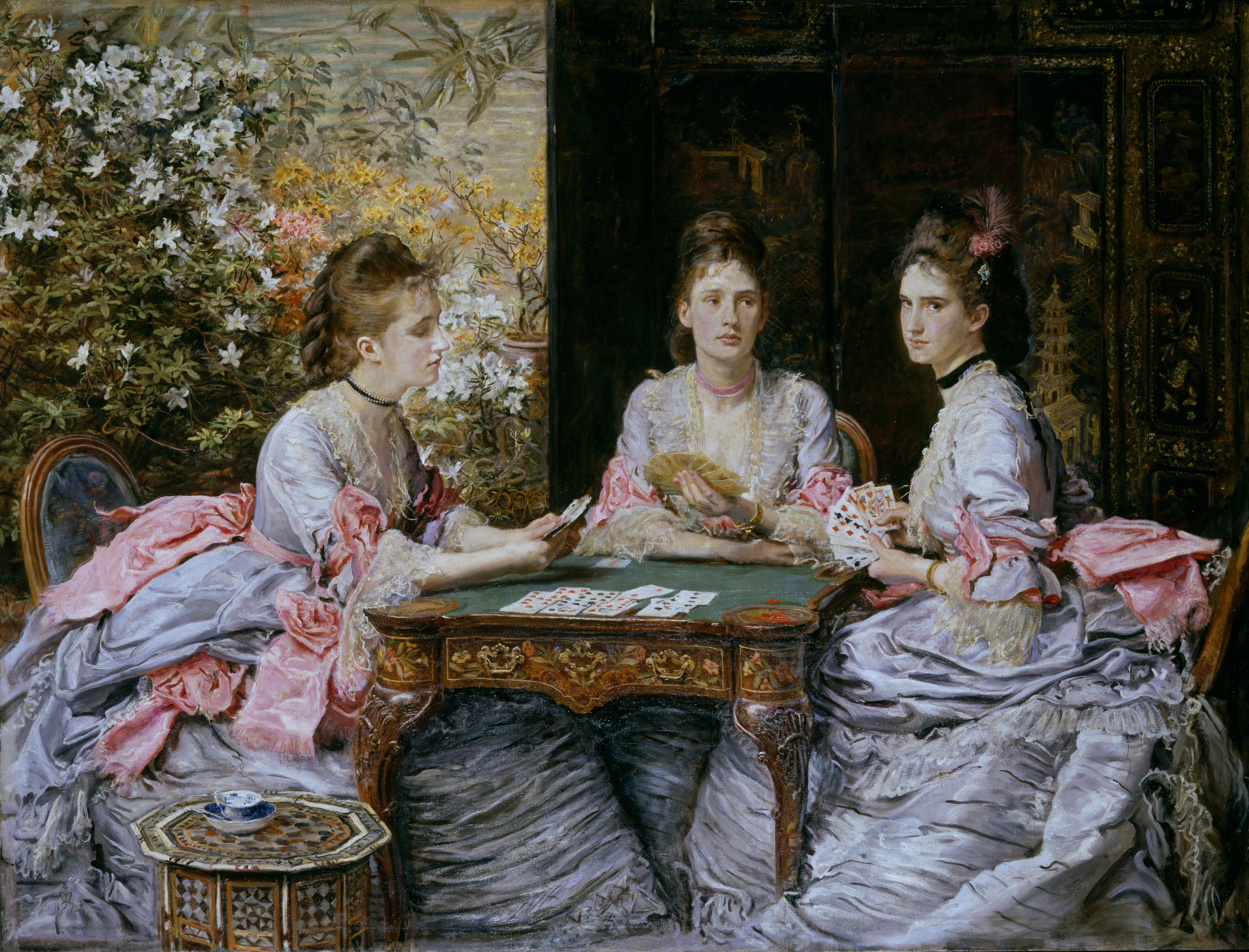
- Artist: John Everett Millais
- Year: 1872
- Type: Oil on canvas, portrait painting
- Dimensions: 165.7 cm × 219.7 cm (65.2 in × 86.5 in)
- Location: Tate Britain, London

Hearts are Trumps is an 1872 oil painting by the British artist John Everett Millais. It features three young woman playing cards. The title suggests a play on the idea of love and the marriage market by likening it to a game. The work was commissioned by the businessman and art collector Walter Armstrong (1824-1884) and represent his three daughters Elizabeth, Diana and Mary. They were the sisters of the art historian Walter Armstrong. It is occasionally also referred to as The Armstrong Sisters.

The painting was displayed at the Royal Academy Exhibition of 1872 held at Burlington House in London. It has drawn comparisons to the 1781 painting The Ladies Waldegrave by Joshua Reynolds The picture is now in the collection of the Tate Britain, having been received via the Chantrey Bequest in 1945.

== See also ==
- List of paintings by John Everett Millais

== Bibliography ==
- Barlow, Paul. Time Present and Time Past: The Art of John Everett Millais. Routledge, 2017.
- Cohen, Michael. Sisters: Relation and Rescue in Nineteenth-century British Novels and Paintings. Fairleigh Dickinson University Press, 1995.
- Jiminez, Jill Berk. Dictionary of Artists' Models. Taylor & Francis, 2013.
- Riding, Christine. Tate British Artists: John Everett Millais. Harry N. Abrams, 2006
