= Ballachulish House =

Coordinates: 56°41′2″N 5°11′13″W

- Interactive map of Ballachulish House

Restaurant information
- Rating: (Michelin Guide 2008)
- Location: Ballachulish, Highland, PH49 4JX, Scotland

Ballachulish House is a restaurant located in Ballachulish, Highland, Scotland. As of 2008, the restaurant holds one star in the Michelin Guide.
