= Orr-Ewing =

Orr-Ewing is a surname originating with the sons of William Ewing (1772–1853) and Susan Orr (1785–1860) who combined their parents' surnames and became Orr-Ewing.

- Alice Orr-Ewing (born 1989), British actress
- Andrew Orr-Ewing (born 1965), British chemist
- Sir Archibald Orr-Ewing (1818–1893), Scottish politician
- Charles Lindsay Orr-Ewing (1860–1903), Scottish politician
- Ian Leslie Orr-Ewing (1893–1958), British politician
- Ian Orr-Ewing, Baron Orr-Ewing (1912–1999), British politician
