= Raeburn =

Raeburn is a surname. Notable people with the surname include:

- Agnes Raeburn (1872–1955), Scottish artist
- Anna Raeburn (born 1944), British broadcaster and journalist
- Boyd Raeburn U.S. jazz bandleader and bass saxophonist
- David Raeburn (1927–2021), British classical translator and director
- Henry Raeburn (1756–1823), Scottish portrait painter
- Harold Raeburn (1865–1926), British mountaineer
- Julieon Raeburn (born 1978), Trinidadian athlete
- Marvin Raeburn (born 1975), Trinidadian football player
- Paul Raeburn, U.S. science writer

== See also ==
- Raeburn Place, playing fields in Edinburgh, Scotland
- Rayburn (disambiguation)
- Deanna Raybourn
- Michael E. Reiburn (1893–1982), New York politician
