= Deanna Raybourn =

American novelist

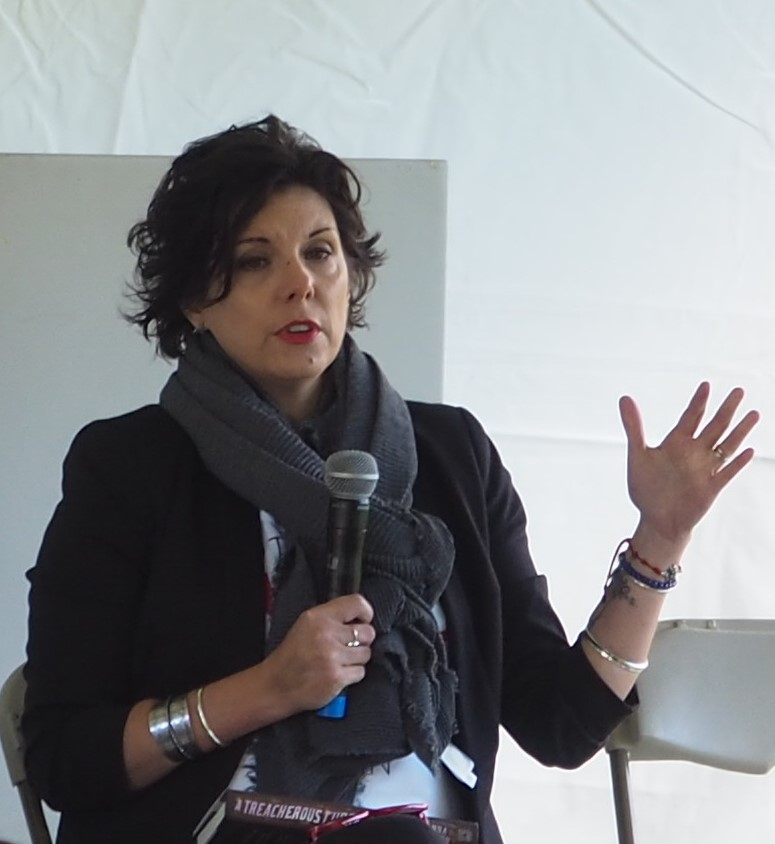
- Born: June 17, 1968 (age 58); Fort Worth
- Education: University of Texas at San Antonio
- Writing career
- Genre: Historical fiction
- Notable awards: RITA Award for Best Novel with Strong Romantic Elements
- Website: www.deannaraybourn.com

Deanna Raybourn (born June 17, 1968) is an American author of historical fiction and historical mystery novels.

== Biography ==
Raybourn was born in Fort Worth, Texas, but currently resides in Williamsburg, Virginia. She graduated from the University of Texas at San Antonio where she earned a degree in English and History.

Her debut novel, Silent in the Grave, was nominated for the Agatha Award for Best First Novel in 2007. Set in Victorian era England, the acclaimed series has been optioned for a UK television series by Free@Last TV.

== Bibliography ==
=== Lady Julia Grey mysteries ===
- Silent in the Grave, 2007 (hardcover ISBN 978-0-7783-2410-2, mass market ISBN 978-0-7783-2524-6)
- Silent in the Sanctuary, 2008 (paperback ISBN 978-0-7783-2492-8, mass market ISBN 978-0-7783-2492-8)
- Silent on the Moor, 2009 (paperback ISBN 978-0-7783-2614-4, mass market ISBN 978-0-7783-0304-6)
- Dark Road to Darjeeling, 2010 (paperback ISBN 978-0-7783-2820-9)
- The Dark Enquiry, 2011 (paperback ISBN 9780778312376)
- Silent Night, 2012 (paperback ISBN 978-1-4592-3795-7)
- "Midsummer Night" novella, 2013 (e-book ISBN 978-1459254879)
- "Twelfth Night" novella, 2014 (e-book ISBN 978-1459256187)
- "Bonfire Night" novella, 2014 (e-book ISBN 978-1460338148)

=== Veronica Speedwell mysteries ===
- A Curious Beginning, 2015 (hardcover ISBN 978-0-4514-7601-2)
- A Perilous Undertaking, 2017 (hardcover ISBN 978-0-4514-7615-9)
- A Treacherous Curse, 2018 (hardcover ISBN 978-0-4514-7617-3)
- A Dangerous Collaboration, 2019 (hardcover ISBN 978-0-4514-9071-1)
- A Murderous Relation, 2020 (hardcover ISBN 978-0-4514-9074-2)
- An Unexpected Peril, 2021 (hardcover ISBN 978-0-5931-9726-4)
- An Impossible Impostor, 2022 (hardcover ISBN 978-0-5931-9729-5)
- A Sinister Revenge, 2023 (hardcover ISBN 978-0-5935-4592-8)
- A Grave Robbery, 2024 (hardcover ISBN 978-0-5935-4595-9)
- A Ghastly Catastrophe, 2026 (hardcover ISBN 978-0-5938-1573-1)

=== Other fiction ===
- The Dead Travel Fast, 2010 (paperback ISBN 978-0-7783-2765-3)
- Far in the Wilds novella prequel, 2013 (e-book ISBN 978-1-4592-4909-7)
- A Spear of Summer Grass, 2013 (paperback ISBN 978-0-7783-1439-4)
- "Whisper of Jasmine" novella prequel, 2014 (e-book ISBN 978-1460329764)
- City of Jasmine, 2014 (paperback ISBN 978-0-7783-1621-3)
- Night of a Thousand Stars, 2014 (paperback ISBN 978-0-7783-1775-3)
- Killers of a Certain Age, 2022 (hardback ISBN 978-0593200681)
- Kills Well with Others, 2025

=== Nonfiction ===
- chapter in Scribbling Women and the Real-Life Romance Heroes Who Love Them, 2014 (paperback ISBN 978-1310454141)
- contribution to The Mystery Writers of America Cookbook, 2015 (hardcover ISBN 978-1594747571)
