= David Rhind =

Scottish architect (1808–1883)

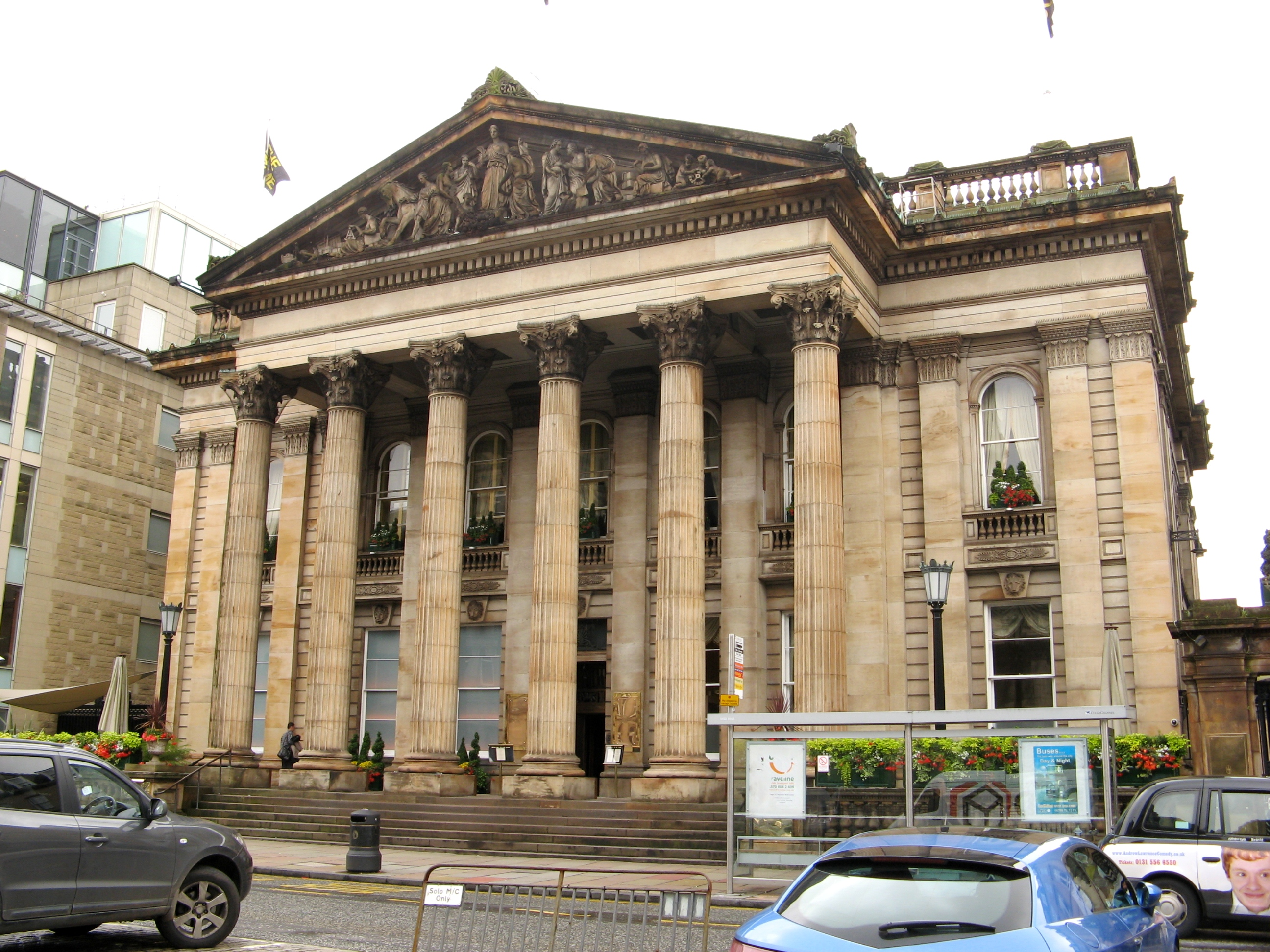
The former Commercial Bank of Scotland, George Street, Edinburgh, 1847

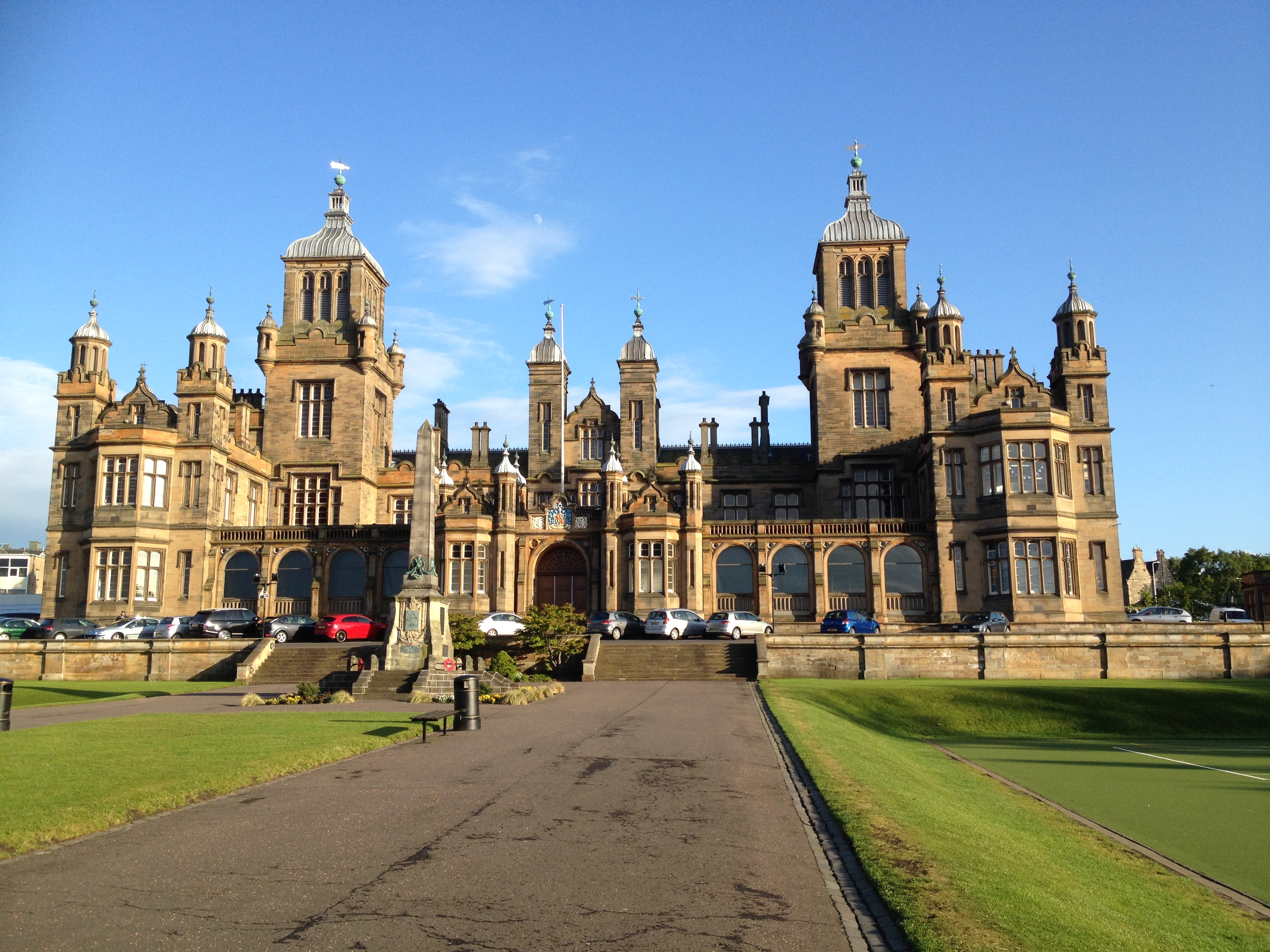
Daniel Stewart's Hospital, opened in 1855

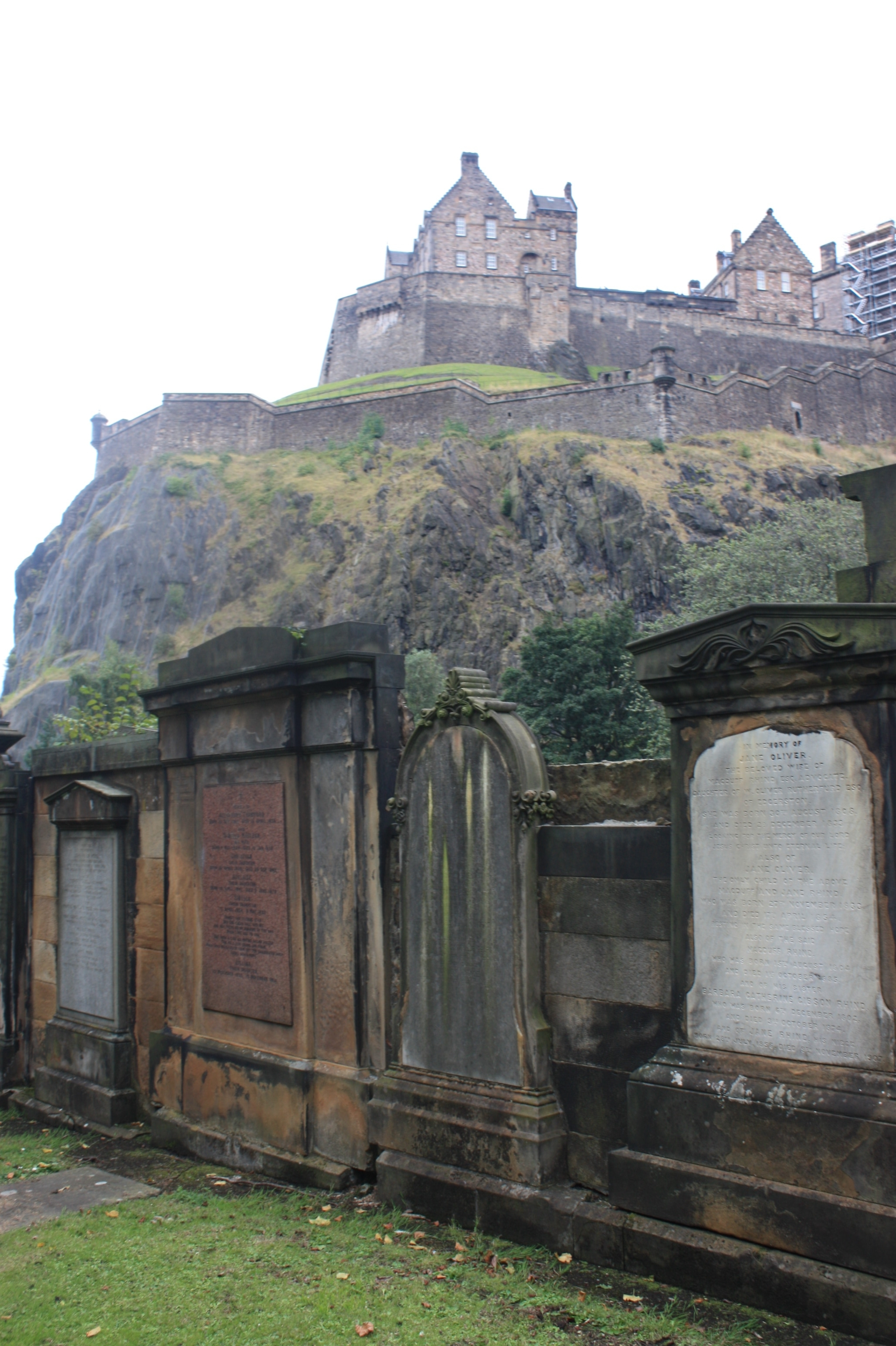
Grave of David Rhind (centre), St Cuthberts, Edinburgh

David Rhind FRSE (1808 – 26 April 1883) was a Scottish architect, mainly remembered for his public buildings, banks, churches and schools, most of which are now listed buildings.

== Life ==
Rhind was born at 15 Gayfield Place in Edinburgh in 1808, the son of John Rhind. His father at the time of his birth is listed as a "writer" (a standard Scots term for a lawyer) but later became a cashier to the Edinburgh Friendly Insurance Company). His wife, David's mother, was named Marion Anderson. David Rhind was married twice: firstly to Emily Shoubridge in 1840; then to Mary Jane Sackville-Pearson in 1845. He lived until 1883 and was survived by eight of his children.

He is believed to have trained in the London drawing office of Augustus Charles Pugin and was a friend of Charles Barry. His practice began in Edinburgh, but examples of his work were constructed all over Scotland.

David worked in conjunction with Alexander Handyside Ritchie who executed much of the sculptural work on his buildings.

David Rhind's work included many branches of the Commercial Bank of Scotland, including their headquarters on George Street, Edinburgh, which is now The Dome bar and restaurant. Other buildings for the Commercial Bank, now part of the Royal Bank of Scotland, were constructed as far apart as Thurso and Jedburgh. He also designed a number of churches, local government buildings, schools, offices and private residences such as Carlowrie Castle. One of his grandest schemes was Daniel Stewart's Hospital (1848-1870, then Daniel Stewart's College 1870-1972) now Stewart's Melville College, Edinburgh. He employed Neo-Classical and Baronial styles (amongst others) during his work.

In 1849, Rhind was commissioned by Sir John Maxwell, 8th Baronet, to design the lay-out of the Pollokshields area of Glasgow, in what until then had been farmland 2 miles (3.2 km) south of the city centre.

He spent most of his working life (plus living with his family until retiral in 1877) at 54 Great King Street in the Second New Town of Edinburgh.

He was responsible for training John Dick Peddie, Robert Morham, James W Smith, Hippolyte Blanc, John Russell Walker and James McGlashen Ross.

He is buried with his family, including his wife Mary Jane Sackville Pearson (1825–1892) in St Cuthberts Churchyard in Edinburgh under the shadow of Edinburgh Castle. The grave lies on the south wall of the first south section, south of the church, backing onto the railway line. The monument is one of the most modest in its row. David's name is listed low on the stone, and easily missed.

== Freemasonry ==
Rhind was a Scottish Freemason. He was Initiated in Lodge Canongate Kilwinning, No. 2, on 28 November 1835.

== Principal works ==
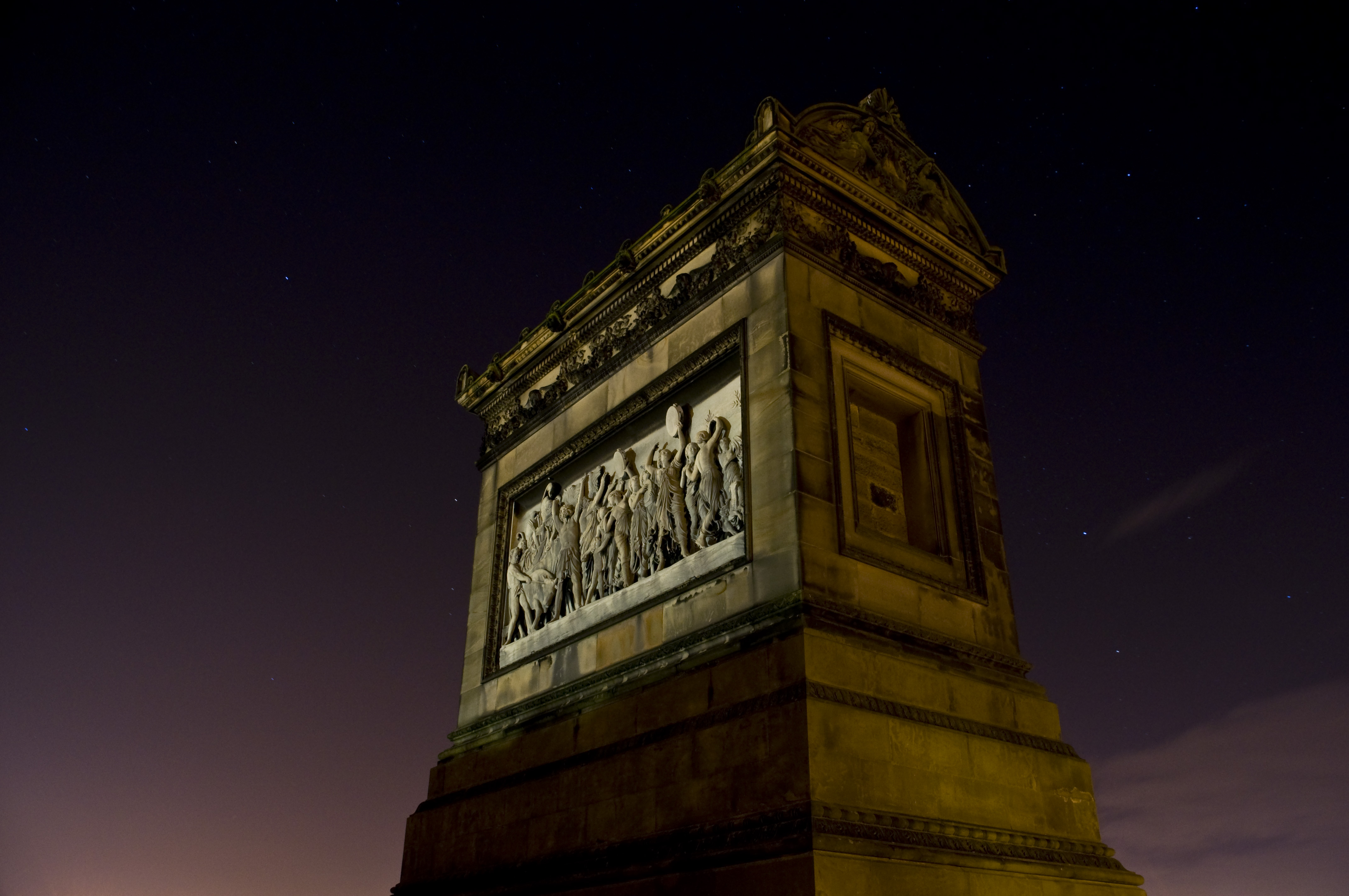
The 'Craigentinny Marbles', final resting place of William Henry Miller, designed by David Rhind, with bas relief sculptures by Alfred Gatley, this on the south side depicting "The Song of Moses and Miriam"

- Numerous banks for the Commercial Bank of Scotland
- Scott Monument, Glasgow (1837)
- Camelon Church, Falkirk (1838)
- Victoria Place Church, Falkirk (1838)
- Mausoleum to William Henry Miller (1848)
- Daniel Stewart's Hospital (1848-1870), then Daniel Stewart's College (1870-1972), now Stewart's Melville College) (1972 -)
- Carlowrie Castle (1851)
- Extension to Calderwood Castle (c. 1842)
- St Luke's Episcopal Church, Dumbarton (1855)
- Old Sheriff Court House, Oban (1856)
- Kilmany Parish Church, Fife (1860)
- Dumfries Sheriff Court (1862)
- Hobkirk Parish Church (1862)
- Wick Sheriff Court (1862)
- Roberton Parish Church (1863)
- Sheriff Court House, Kirkcudbright (1868)
- Sheriff Court House and Prison, Lerwick, Shetland (1873)
