= Charles George Lewis =

British printmaker

Charles George Lewis (13 June 1808 – 16 June 1880) was a British printmaker.

== Life ==
The second son of Frederick Christian Lewis, and brother of John Frederick Lewis, he was born in Enfield, Middlesex. He was instructed in drawing and engraving by his father.

Lewis retired in about 1877, and died suddenly from apoplexy at his residence at Felpham, near Bognor, on 16 June 1880. He was buried in Felpham churchyard.

== Works ==
Lewis had a facility in etching, and in combining line engraving, stipple, and mezzotint.

Many of his best-known plates were after the works of Sir Edwin Landseer. The earliest of these was Hafed, published in 1837. Besides these were smaller plates after works of Landseer, most of which had previously been engraved by Thomas Landseer and others. His etchings after Landseer began with To-ho! published in 1830, and included the set of eight plates of The Mothers.

Lewis engraved also some plates after Rosa Bonheur. His works after other painters included:

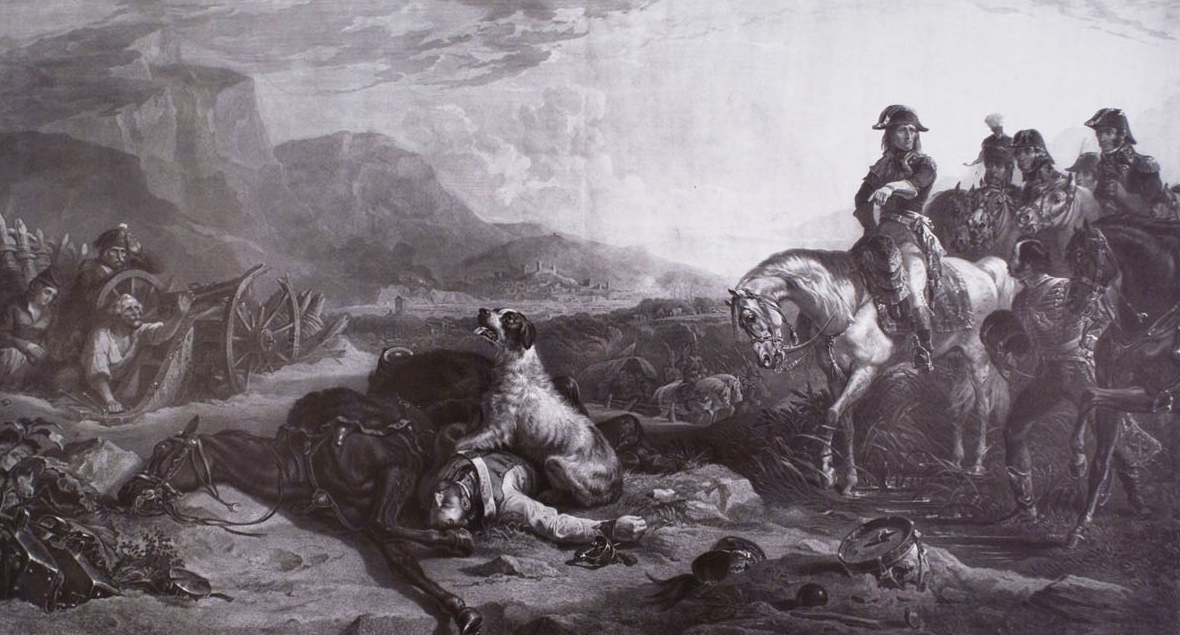
Bonaparte a Bassano, engraving by Charles George Lewis, after Thomas Jones Barker

- Interior of a Highland Cottage, after John Frederick Lewis
- Robinson Crusoe reading the Bible to his Man Friday and Asking a Blessing, after Alexander George Fraser
- The Village Festival and The Card Players, after Sir David Wilkie
- The Bay of Spezzia, Sea-shore, and Sunset, after Richard Parkes Bonington
- The Highland Larder, after Frederick Tayler
- The Waterloo Heroes, after John Prescott Knight
- The Melton Breakfast, after Sir Francis Grant
- The Introduction of Christianity into Great Britain, after John Rogers Herbert
- Eton Montem: the School Yard and The Playing Fields, a pair, after William Evans of Eton
- Sheep Farming in the Highlands, a set of four plates, and Rescued, after Richard Ansdell
- A Plunge for Life, after Samuel Carter
- The Crucifixion, after Henry Courtney Selous
- Morning on the Seine, after J. Troyon
- The Salon d'Or, after William Powell Frith
- A Panic, after Henry William Banks Davis
- Picardy Peasants going to a Fair, after Richard Beavis

and several historical plates after Thomas Jones Barker.

== Notes ==
Attribution

This article incorporates text from a publication now in the public domain: Lee, Sidney, ed. (1893). "Lewis, Charles George". Dictionary of National Biography. Vol. 33. London: Smith, Elder & Co.
