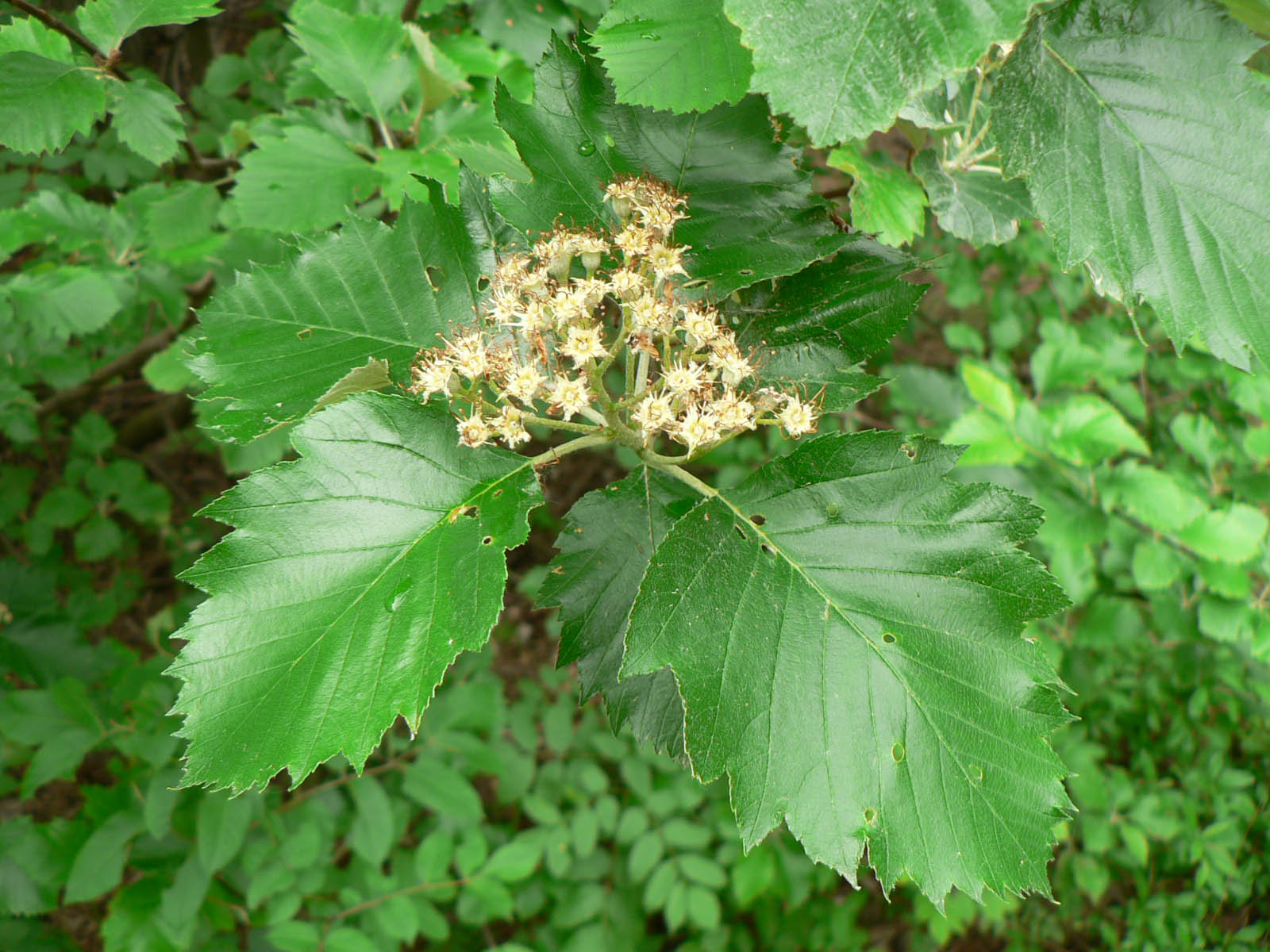
- Flowering branch of Aria semi-incisa

Conservation status
- Vulnerable (IUCN 3.1)

Scientific classification
- Kingdom: Plantae
- Clade: Tracheophytes
- Clade: Angiosperms
- Clade: Eudicots
- Clade: Rosids
- Order: Rosales
- Family: Rosaceae
- Genus: Aria
- Species: A. semi-incisa

Binomial name
- Aria semi-incisa (Borbás) Beck
- It is endemic to the Visegrád, Gerecse, Buda, and Pilis Mountains, Hungary

Synonyms
- List: Karpatiosorbus semi-incisa (Borbás) Sennikov & Kurtto; Pyrus semi-incisa (Borbás) M.F.Fay & Christenh.; Sorbus aria f. semi-incisa Borbás; Sorbus aria var. semi-incisa (Borbás) Borbás; Sorbus decipiens subsp. semiincisa (Borbás) Hedl.; Sorbus latifolia var. semi-incisa (Borbás) C.K.Schneid.; Sorbus semi-incisa (Borbás) Borbás

= Aria semi-incisa =

Species of tree in the family Rosaceae

Aria semi-incisa is an apomictic species of tree in the family Rosaceae endemic to the Visegrád, Gerecse, Buda, and Pilis Mountains, Hungary. It is a vulnerable species.

== Description ==
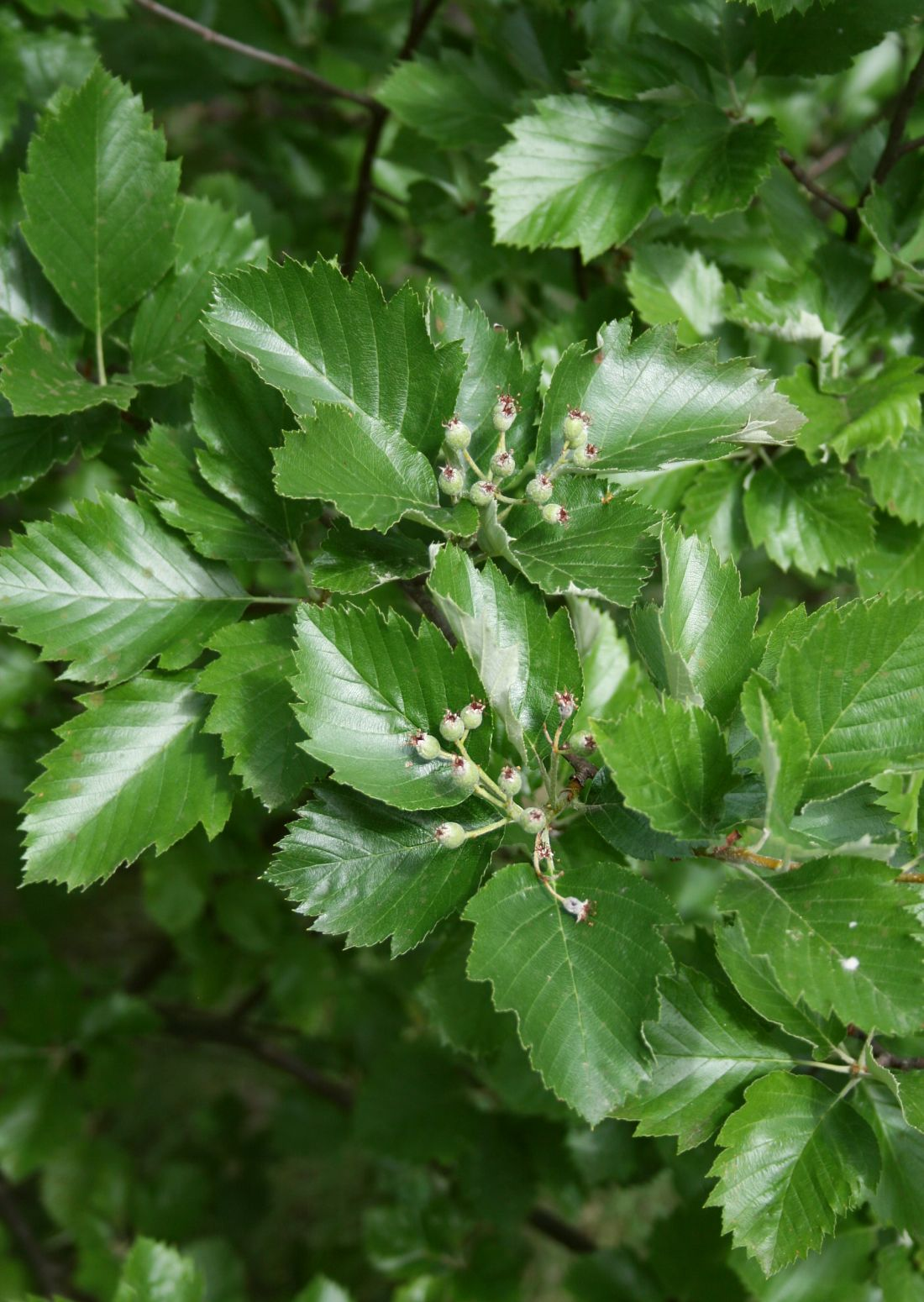
Fruiting Aria semi-incisa

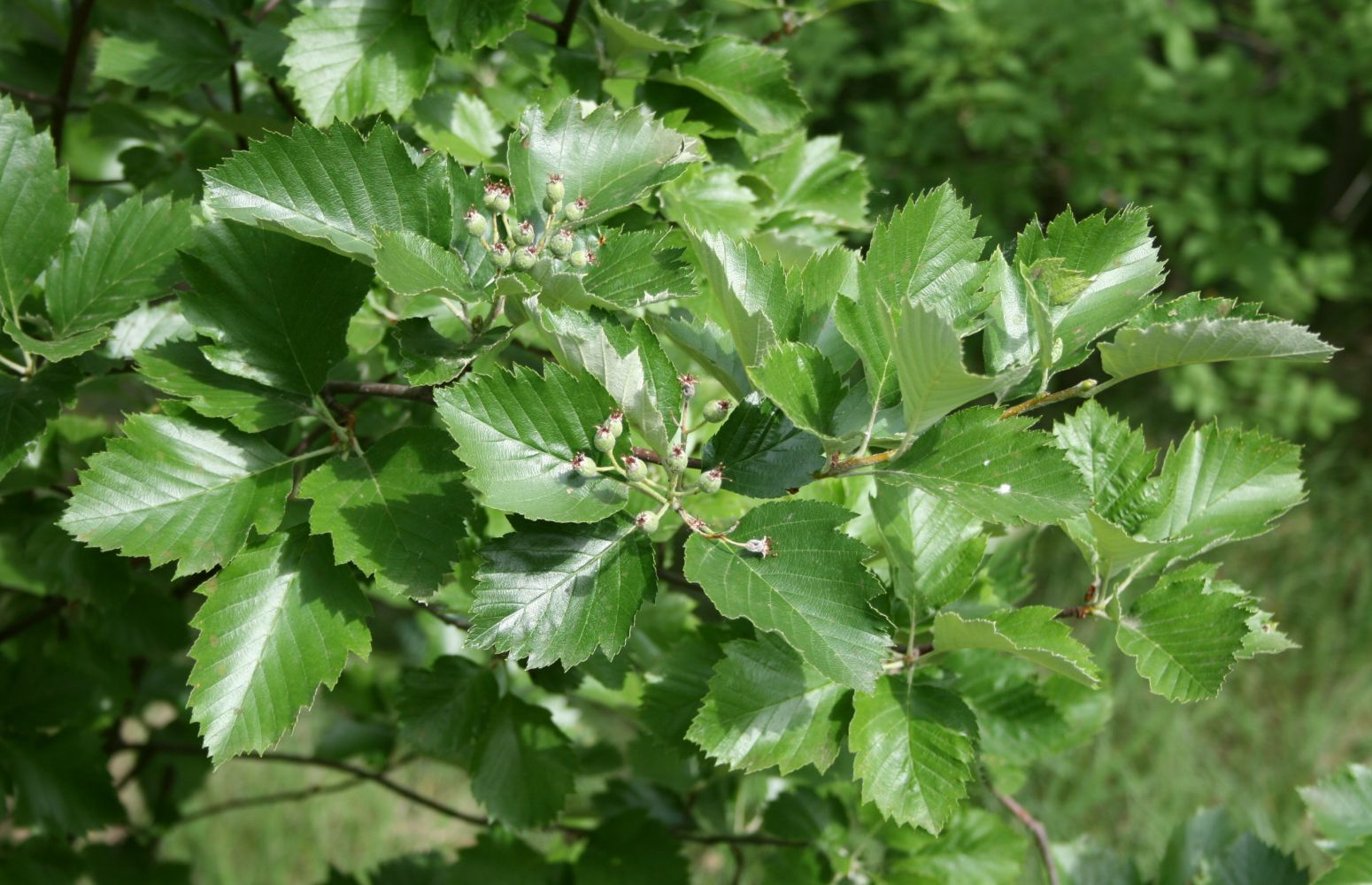
Fruiting Aria semi-incisa

=== Vegetative characteristics ===
Aria semi-incisa is an up to 10 m tall, and 5–6 m wide, deciduous tree, or more rarely a shrub with a wide cone-shaped crown. The branches are dark grey to brown. The broadly ovate to rounded-ovate, lobed, 11 cm long, and 9 cm wide, dark green, glossy leaves with a serrated margin have 8–9 pairs of lateral veins. The lamina is widened towards the base. The triangular lobes are acuminate. The greenish-grey abaxial leaf surface is tomentose. The petiole is tomentose. The foliage turns brownish-yellow in autumn.

=== Generative characteristics ===
The tomentose inflorescence bears white, 1 cm wide flowers. The flower has 2 styles. The globose, red to orange-red, 1 cm wide fruit bears white lenticels. The seeds are elliptical. Flowering occurs in May and fruits ripen in August to September.

=== Cytology ===
It is triploid. Privious reports of a diploid ploidy level are incorrect.

== Taxonomy ==
It was first described as Sorbus aria f. semi-incisa Borbás by Vincze von Borbás in 1879. It was moved to the genus Aria (Pers.) J.Jacq. ex Host by Günther Beck von Mannagetta und Lerchenau in 1892.

=== Etymology ===
The specific epithet semi-incisa is derived from semi- meaning meaning half, partly, partial, or almost, and incisa from the Latin incidere meaning incised or cut in two.

== Distribution and habitat ==
It is endemic to the Visegrád Mountains, Gerecse Mountains, Buda Mountains and Pilis Mountains, Hungary, north of Budapest, extending north close to the Slovakian border. It occurs in 7 locations with a total area of 840 km^{2} where it grows in temperate forests mainly on limestone, with dry-soil on sunny slopes.

== Ecology ==
Botanical illustration of Aria semi-incisa

The caterpillars of the moth Stigmella mespilicola feed on Aria semi-incisa.

== Conservation ==
It is a vulnerable species with a population of more than 1000 mature trees. In the Red List of threatened tree and shrub species of Hungary, it is categorised as Near threatened (NT). It is threatened by the decline of the habitat quality caused by forest clearance, and by the introduction of alien species. It is cultivated in numerous ex situ conservation collection in botanic gardens, such as the Wynkcoombe Arboretum, Arboretum Robert Lenoir the Thenford Gardens & Arboretum, the Arboretum and Botanical Garden, University of Bergen, the Belmonte Arboretum, the Budai Arborétum, and the Arboretum SGGW W Rogowie.

== Uses ==
It is suitable to be grown as a solitary ornamental plant in gardens in bright or semi-shaded locations.
