= Roger Payne (disambiguation) =

Roger Payne (1935–2023) was an American biologist.

Roger Payne may also refer to:

- Roger Payne (bookbinder) (1739–1797), English bookbinder
- Roger Payne (mountaineer) (1956–2012), British mountaineer
