= Street Scene near the El Ghouri Mosque in Cairo =

Painting by John Frederick Lewis

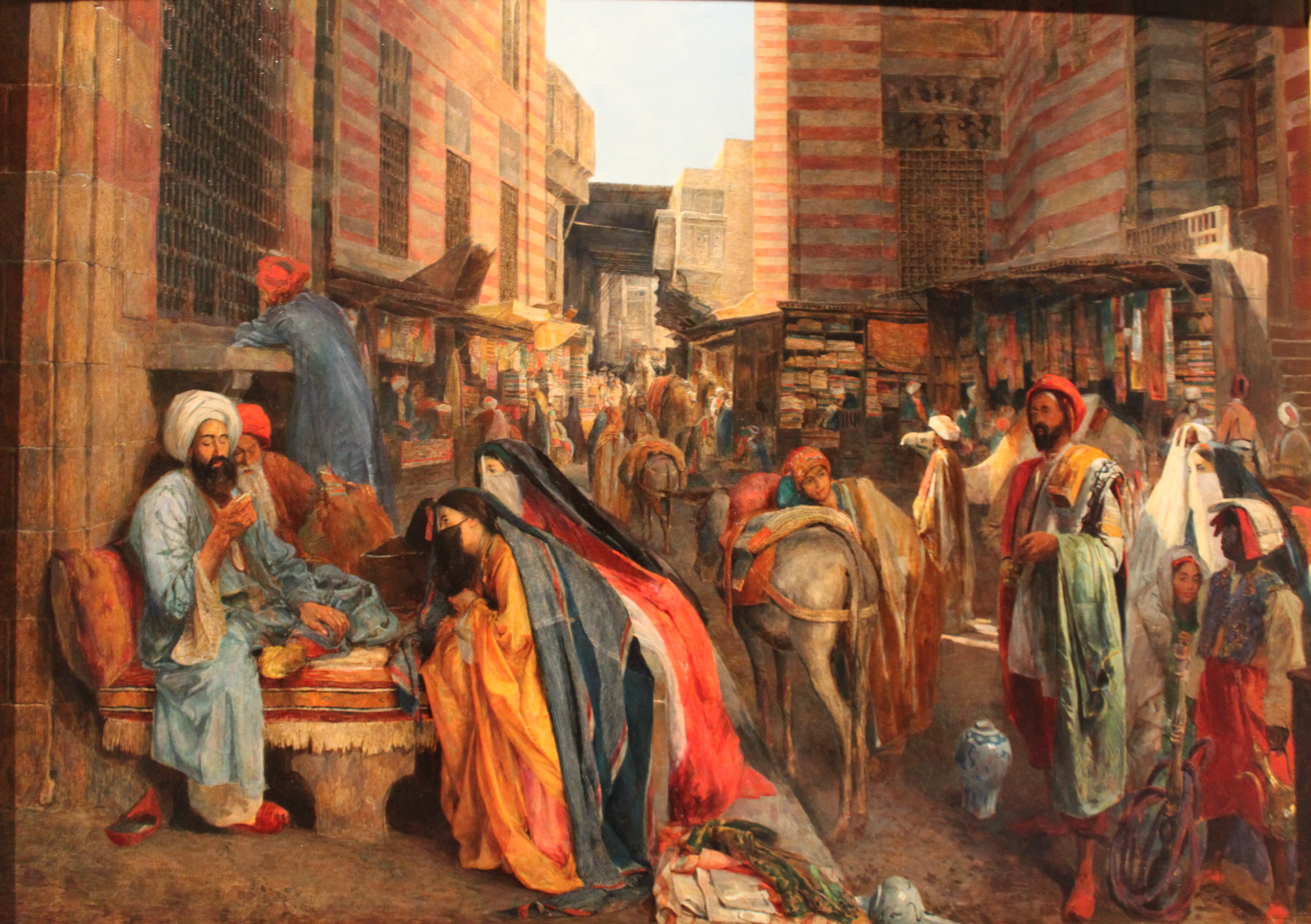
- Artist: John Frederick Lewis
- Year: c.1876
- Medium: Oil and watercolour on paper, mounted on panel
- Dimensions: 76 cm × 103 cm (30 in × 41 in)
- Location: Musée du Louvre, Paris

Street Scene near the El Ghouri Mosque in Cairo is a c. 1876 oil and watercolour painting by the British Orientalist artist John Frederick Lewis, produced just before his death. He had left Cairo around 25 years earlier, after twelve years there. He based it on a drawing he had made from life between 1841 and 1851, which is now in the Courtauld Gallery in London. The final work belonged to Christopher Forbes and was among works given to the Louvre's American Friends in 2011 by Forbes' family.

It shows both sides of Al-Mu'izz li-Din Allah Street, the main street of medieval Cairo, between the Zuweila Gate and the El Foutouh Gate, at the intersection of El Azhar Street. On the right are the stairs and the porch to the El Ghouri madrasa and mosque. To the left is the cenotaph of the sultan (whose body was never recovered after the 1516 Battle of Marj Dabiq north of Aleppo against the Ottomans) and a sabil-kuttab; both of these buildings were commissioned by Mamluk sultan Al-Ghuri in 1504-1505 and are collectively known as the Wékalet Al-Ghuri.
