= Francis Bedford =

Francis Bedford may refer to:

- Francis Octavius Bedford (1784–1858), English architect
- Francis Bedford (photographer) (1816–1894), English photographer
- Francis Bedford (bookbinder) (1799–1883), English bookbinder
- Francis Donkin Bedford (1864–1954), English artist and book illustrator
