= George Robert Lewis =

English painter

George Robert Lewis (1782–1871) was a versatile English painter of landscapes and portraits.

== Life ==
The younger brother of Frederick Christian Lewis and of Charles Lewis the bookbinder, he was born in London on 27 March 1782. He studied under Henry Fuseli in the schools of the Royal Academy, and worked on both nature and antiquities.

Lewis sent landscapes to the exhibitions of 1805–7; he at that time lived with his brother Frederick at Enfield, and worked for him on John Chamberlaine's Original Designs of the most celebrated Masters and William Young Ottley's Italian School of Design, for both of which he made aquatint plates. In 1813, he toured North Wales with John Linnell. In 1818, he accompanied Thomas Frognall Dibdin, to make drawings, on a continental journey, and his illustrations to the Bibliographical and Picturesque Tour through France and Germany were published in 1821.

From 1820 to 1859, Lewis exhibited portraits, landscapes, and figure subjects at the Royal Academy, the British Institution, the Suffolk Street Gallery, and the Oil and Water-colour Society. He died at Hampstead on 15 May 1871.

== Works ==
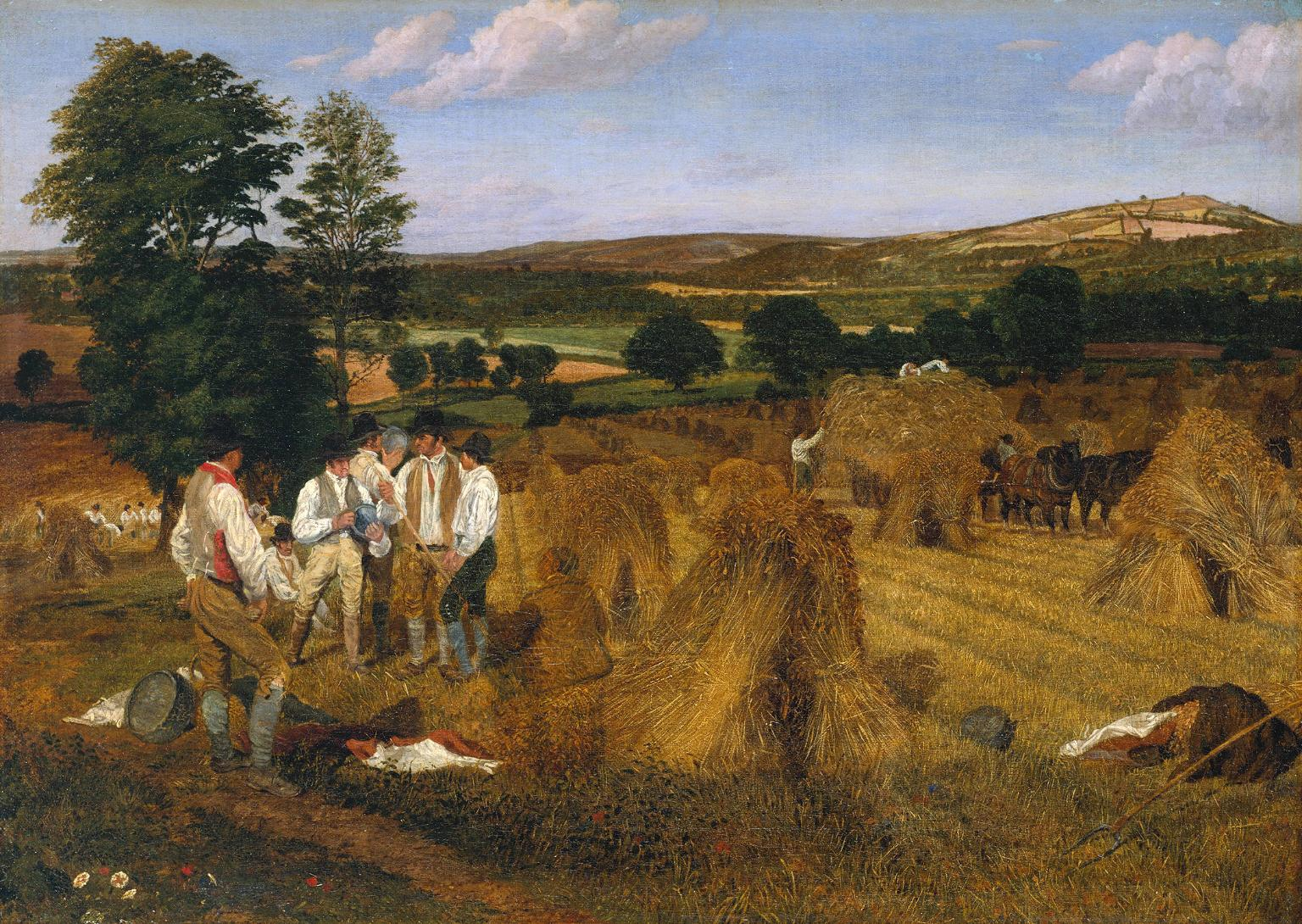
Hereford, Dynedor and the Malvern Hills, from the Haywood Lodge, Harvest Scene, Afternoon (1815), landscape by George Robert Lewis

Lewis executed some of the plates for Dibdin's Bibliographical Decameron (1817), in which he and his brothers Frederick and Charles were eulogised. He etched a series of Groups illustrating the Physiognomy, Manners, and Character of the People of France and Germany, issued in parts and completed in 1823. He published, among other works:

- Views of the Muscles of the Human Body, 1820;
- Banks of the Loire illustrated—Tours;
- Illustrations of Phrenology, 1841;
- Illustrations of Kilpeck Church, Herefordshire, with an Essay on Ecclesiastical Design and a Descriptive Interpretation, 1842;
- The Ancient Font of Little Walsingham Church, 1843; and
- The Ancient Church of Shobdon, Herefordshire, illustrated and described, 1852; reissued in 1856.

Some of Lewis's portraits were engraved, and he aquatinted a large plate of the procession of the knights of the order of the Bath in Westminster Abbey, after Frederick Nash. In 1838, he printed An Address on the subject of Education as connected with Design in every department of British Manufacture, together with Hints on the Education of the Poor generally (Hereford).

== Notes ==
Attribution

This article incorporates text from a publication now in the public domain: Lee, Sidney, ed. (1893). "Lewis, George Robert". Dictionary of National Biography. Vol. 33. London: Smith, Elder & Co.
