= Michael Wodhull =

English book-collector and translator (1740–1816)

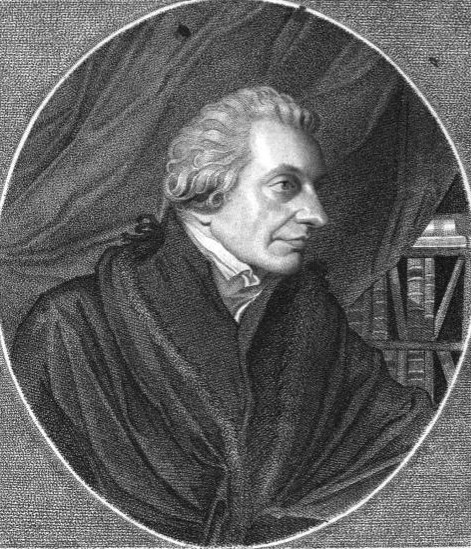
Michael Wodhull

Michael Wodhull (15 August 1740 – 10 November 1816) was an English poet, book-collector, and translator.

== Life ==
The son of John Wodhull (1678–1754) of Thenford, Northamptonshire, by his second wife, Rebeccah (1702–1794), daughter of Charles Watkins of Aynhoe, he was born at Thenford on 15 August 1740. He was sent from a private school at Twyford to Winchester College. On 13 January 1758 he matriculated at Brasenose College, Oxford, but did not take a degree.

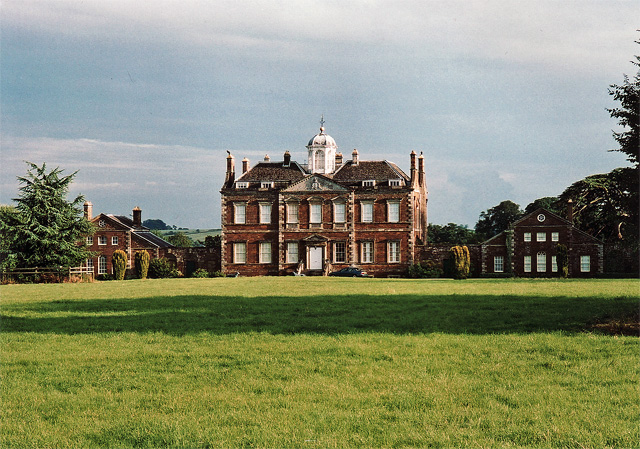
Thenford House today

Wodhull was wealthy, with a town house in Berkeley Square. Around 1765 he built Thenford House, the manor-house replacing an Elizabethan mansion, near the church at Thenford. He was a Whig supporter of civil and religious liberty, and his poems show sympathy with the views of Rousseau. He was High Sheriff of Northamptonshire in 1783. He deprecated the long war with France, and after the treaty of Amiens visited Paris to see its libraries. For a time he was among the détenus of Napoleon, and he came back to England an invalid.

Thomas Frognall Dibdin and Richard Heber visited Wodhull in the winter of 1815 and found him in bad health. He died at Thenford on 10 November 1816, and was buried in an altar-tomb under a yew-tree on the south side of the chancel.

== Works ==
Wodhull was the first translator into English verse of all the extant writings—nineteen tragedies and fragments—of Euripides. The work was completed (in 4 vols.) in 1782; new edition 1809 (3 vols.). His translation of Medea was vol. lxix. of Sir John Lubbock's Hundred Books; more of the plays in his translation were in Henry Morley's Universal Library. His other writings included:

- Ode to the Muses, 1760.
- A Poetical Epistle to xxxx xxxxxxx [John Cleaver] M.A., Student of Christ Church, 1761; 2nd edit. corrected, 1762.
- Two Odes, 1763.
- Equality of Mankind, a Poem, 1765; with the previous pieces, thus was included in his poems (1772 and 1804), and in Pearch's Collection of Poetry (vol. iv.); also issued revised in 1798 and 1799.
- Poems, 1772; a collection of the pieces published separately (150 copies only printed for presents).
- Poems, revised edit. 1804; prefixed is a portrait of Wodhull, drawn by William Nelson Gardiner in 1801 and engraved by Edward Harding; it was reproduced in Quaritch's Collectors.

Two of Wodhull's poetical pieces are in the Poetical Register for 1806–7 (pp. 241–4 and 481–3). He suppressed his Ode to Criticism, juvenilia as satire of Thomas Warton the younger's poems; but Warton inserted it in The Oxford Sausage (1814, pp. 131–8). He helped with the fourth edition of Edward Harwood 's View of the Classics (1790) and Thomas Frognall Dibdin's Introduction to the Classics (3rd edit.); and was a frequent correspondent in the Gentleman's Magazine, mainly as "L.L.".

== Collector ==
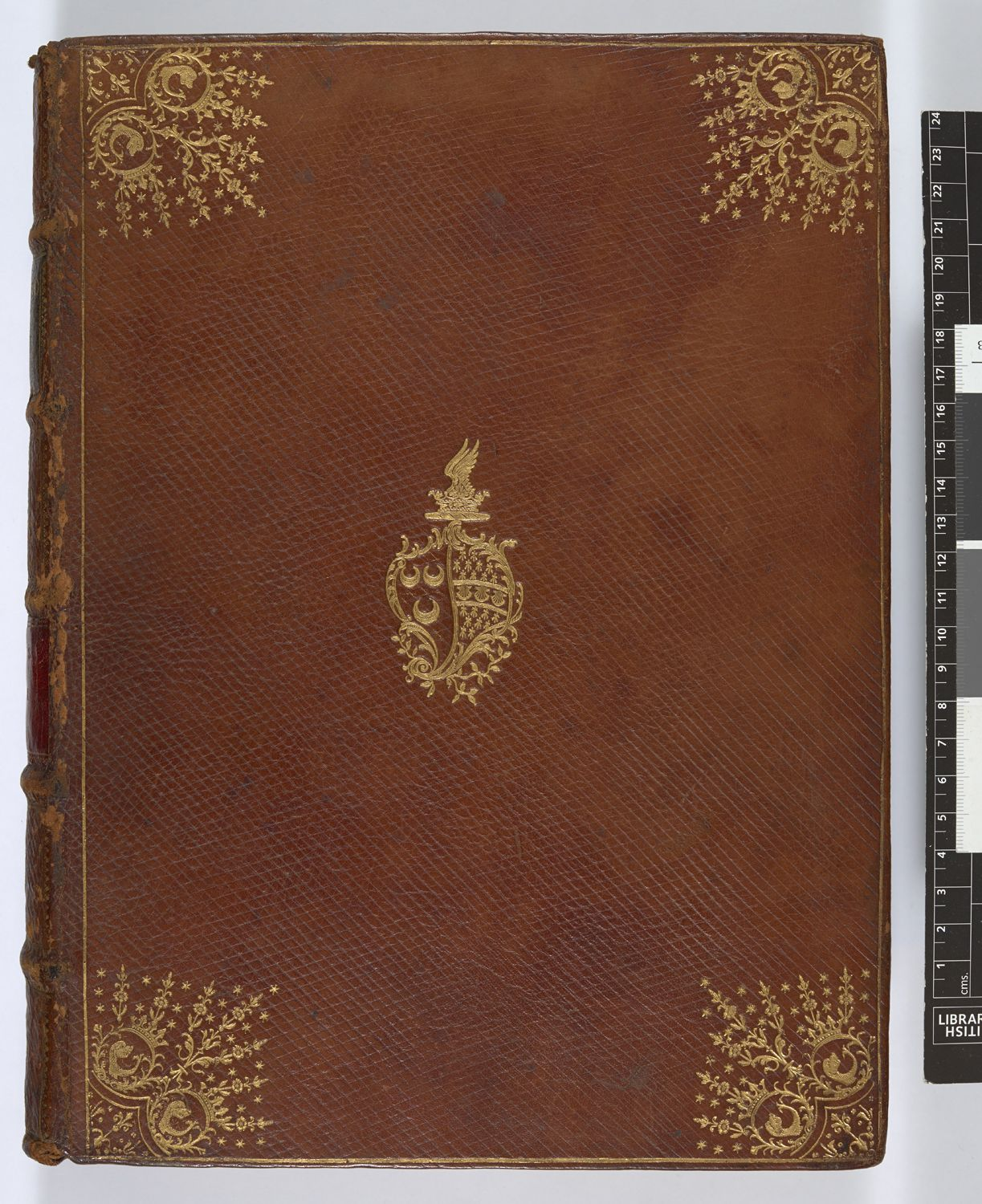
Volume of Thucydides from Michael Wodhull's collection

From 1764 Wodhull frequented the major book-sales in London. J. T. Smith describes him as "very thin, with a long nose and thick lips", and clad in a coat which was tightly buttoned from under his chin. He sat patiently and was disciplined in his bids. Wodhull not only bought but also read his books.

Some of the duplicates in Wodhull's library were sold in 1801 (a five days' sale), and more in 1803 (an eight days' sale). The rest of his collections, about four thousand volumes and many manuscripts, remained at Thenford, the property of the Severne family, until 1886. The printed books were mainly first editions of the classics and rare specimens of early printing in the fifteenth century, many being bound by Roger Payne in Russia leather with Wodhull's arms on the cover. They also contained about fifteen hundred tracts of the seventeenth century, collected by Sir Edward Walker, and many poems and pamphlets of the eighteenth century. They were sold in January 1886 over ten days', and realised £11,972. The sale of his manuscripts took place on 29 and 30 November 1886.

== Family ==
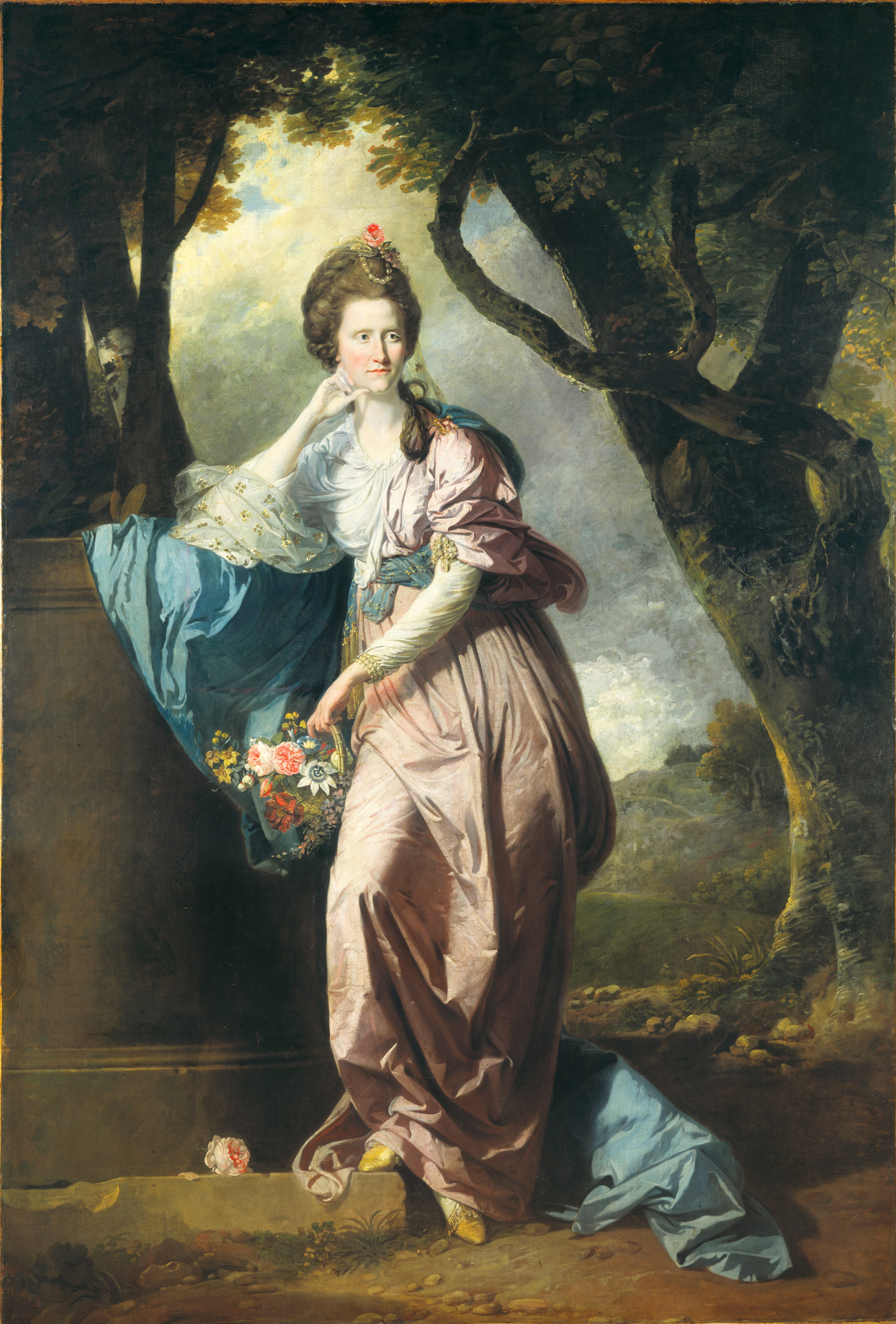
Catherine Wodhull, 1771 portrait by Johan Zoffany

On 30 November 1761 Wodhull married at Newbottle, near Banbury, Catherine Milcah, fourth daughter of the Rev. John Ingram of Wolford, Warwickshire. She died, leaving no issue, at Wolford on 28 May 1808, aged 64, and was buried at Thenford.

By his will, dated 21 August 1815, Wodhull left Thenford, the library, and his other estates to Mary Ingram, his wife's sister; who died on 14 December 1824, and left them to Samuel Amy Severne.
