= Henry Banks (disambiguation) =

Henry Banks (1913–1994) was an English-born American driver.

Henry Banks may also refer to:

- Henry Bankes (1757–1834), English politician and author

== See also ==
- Henry William Banks Davis (1833–1914), English landscape and animal painter
- Harry Banks, improper name of Sergeant Harry Band, also known as The Crucified Soldier
