= Charles Lewis (bookbinder) =

English bookbinder (1786–1836)

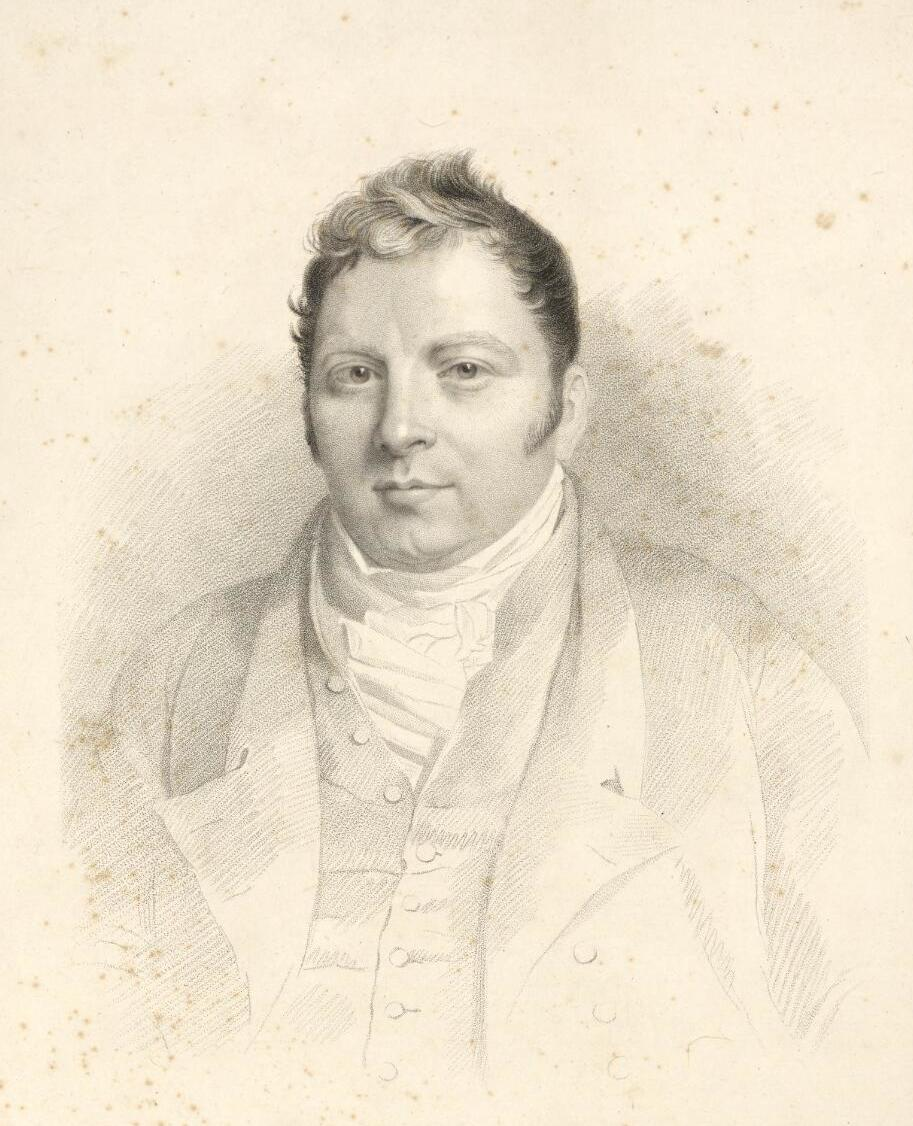
Lewis, c. 1810, by George Robert Lewis

Charles Lewis (1786–1836) was a prominent English bookbinder.

== Life ==
Born in London, Lewis was fourth son of Johann Ludwig, a political refugee from Hanover, and brother of Frederick Christian Lewis and of George Robert Lewis. In 1800, he was apprenticed to the leading bookbinder Henry Walther. After he had spent five years in the forwarding department, Walther refused his request to enter the finishing shop, and so Lewis practised fine work on his own account, into the small hours.

On leaving Walther in 1807, Lewis worked as a journeyman in several other shops, finally setting up in business on his own account in Scotland Yard. He later moved to premises in Denmark Court, and on to Duke Street, St. James's. With C. Kalthoeber he was employed by William Beckford on the Fonthill Abbey library. Thomas Frognall Dibdin (Lord Spencer's librarian) was an admirer of his work and character, and recommended him to other bibliophiles. Lewis was foremost among the bookbinders of London by 1823 and employed 23 journeymen. Lord Spencer (the owner of the Althorp library) had employed him at least as early as 1814 and Dibdin's Biblitheca Spenceriana mentions 235 works (some being in more than one volume) as having bindings by him; Lewis must also have bound many later books for Lord Spencer which are outside the scope of the Bibliotheca Spenceriana. Many of Dibdin's descriptions include remarks complimentary to Lewis.

Lewis died of apoplexy on 8 January 1836. He was succeeded by his eldest son. Francis Bedford had lived with Lewis for some time, and carried on Lewis's style, which was in contrast to the more ornate school of Robert Rivière. According to Dibdin Lewis combined the taste of Roger Payne with "a freedom of forwarding and squareness of finish very peculiar to himself"; he was also successful in book restoration. His main colours were buff or subdued orange for Russia bindings, and French grey for Morocco.

== Notes ==
Attribution This article incorporates text from a publication now in the public domain: Lee, Sidney, ed. (1893). "Lewis, Charles (1786-1836)". Dictionary of National Biography. Vol. 33. London: Smith, Elder & Co.
