= John Frederick Lewis =

English Orientalist painter

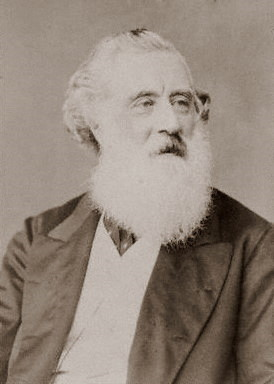
A photo from the late 1860s

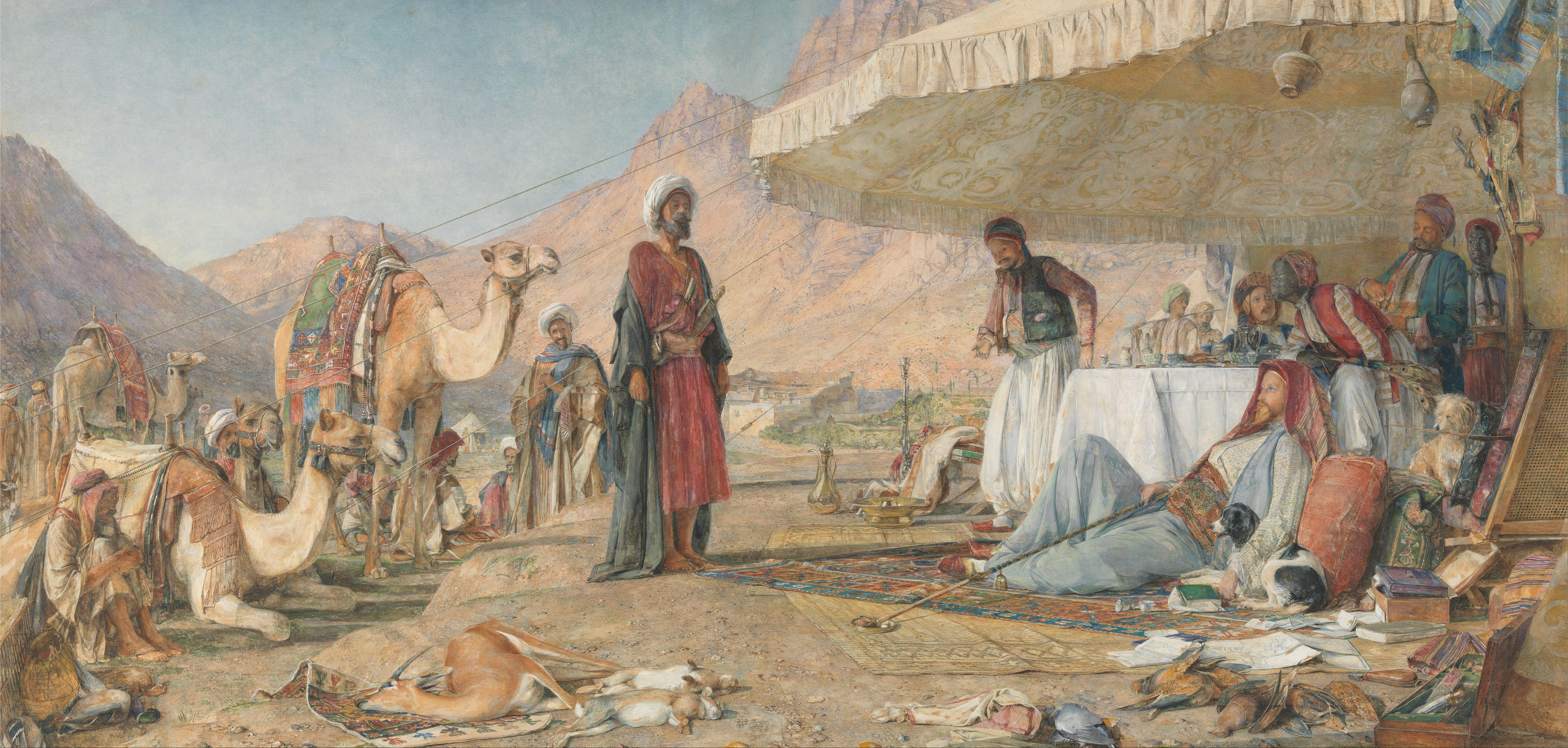
A Frank Encampment in the Desert of Mount Sinai – 1842 – The Convent of St. Catherine in the Distance, showing English aristocrats on a tour, watercolour, 1856

John Frederick Lewis RA (1804–1876) was an English Orientalist painter. He specialized in Oriental and Mediterranean scenes in detailed watercolour or oils, very often repeating the same composition in a version in each medium. He lived for several years in a traditional mansion in Cairo, and after his return to England in 1851 he specialized in highly detailed works showing both realistic genre scenes of Middle Eastern life and more idealized scenes in upper-class Egyptian interiors with little apparent Western influence.

His very careful and loving representation of Islamic architecture, furnishings, screens, and costumes set new standards of realism, which influenced other artists, including the leading French Orientalist painter Jean-Léon Gérôme in his later works. Unlike many other Orientalist painters who took a salacious interest in the women of the Middle East, he "never painted a nude", and his wife modelled for several of his harem scenes. These, with the rare examples by the classicist painter Lord Leighton, imagine "the harem as a place of almost English domesticity, ... [where] ... women's fully clothed respectability suggests a moral healthiness to go with their natural good looks".

== Early life ==
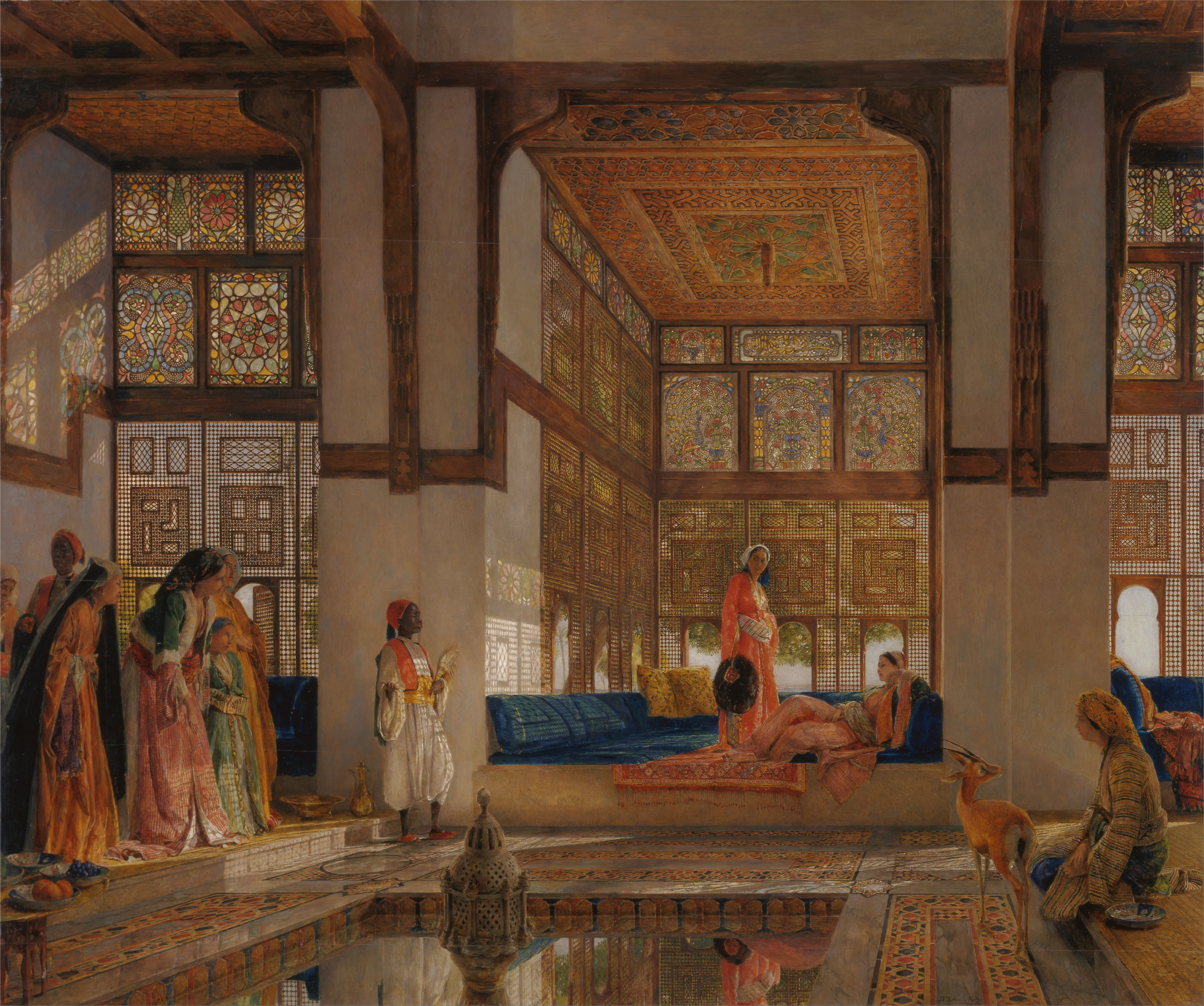
The Reception, 1873, version in oils, using drawings of Lewis' house in Cairo, which he had left over 20 years before

Lewis was born in London on 14 July 1804. He was the son of Frederick Christian Lewis (1779–1856), an engraver and landscape painter, whose German father had moved to England and changed his name from Ludwig. The leading bookbinder Charles Lewis was John Frederick's uncle, and his younger brothers, another Frederick Christian and Charles George Lewis, were also artists, the latter mainly in reproductive engraving, especially after Edwin Landseer (1802–1873), a childhood neighbour and friend of John Frederick.

Lewis and Landseer trained together in the workshop of Sir Thomas Lawrence. Initially Lewis, like Landseer, was an animal painter, and he often included animals throughout his later works, in particular a pet gazelle he had in Cairo. He published prints of the big cats in 1826 and twelve domesticated animals in 1826, and painted two large scenes with animals in Windsor Great Park, now Royal Collection (John Clark(e) with the animals at Sandpit Gate, c. 1825) and Tate Britain.

== Travels ==
Lewis toured Europe in 1827, the year he began to paint in watercolour, then travelled in Spain and Morocco between 1832 and 1834. The drawings he made were turned into lithographs by him and other artists, and published as Sketches and Drawings of the Alhambra, made during a Residence in Granada in the Years 1833–4 (1835) and Lewis's Sketches of Spain and Spanish Character (1836). For a while he became known as "Spanish Lewis", to distinguish him from "Indian Lewis", his brother Frederick Christian, who went to India in 1834 before dying young.

Lewis was an early traveller on what was to become a well-trodden route for English artists, though some ten years behind David Wilkie in Spain. David Roberts, who became the other leading British Orientalist, mainly through his lithographs, was in Spain and the Middle East at the same time as Lewis, though the two rarely met, and William James Müller had been in Cairo in 1838. But no other English artist of the period had such a sustained period in what was then the Ottoman Empire as Lewis did on his last period abroad.

In 1837 he left for travels that took him to Constantinople in 1840, after Italy and Greece. He continued to Egypt and lived in Cairo in rather grand style between 1841 and 1851, in a traditional upper-class house that he often used as a setting for his paintings. He was visited by William Makepeace Thackeray, an old friend, who described him in the comic account of his travels he published as a "languid Lotus-eater" leading a "dreamy, hazy, lazy, tobaccofied life" in a version of local dress that included a "Damascus scimitar" – Lewis was often photographed in such a costume in later life. In 1847 he married Marian Harper in Alexandria.

== Return to England ==
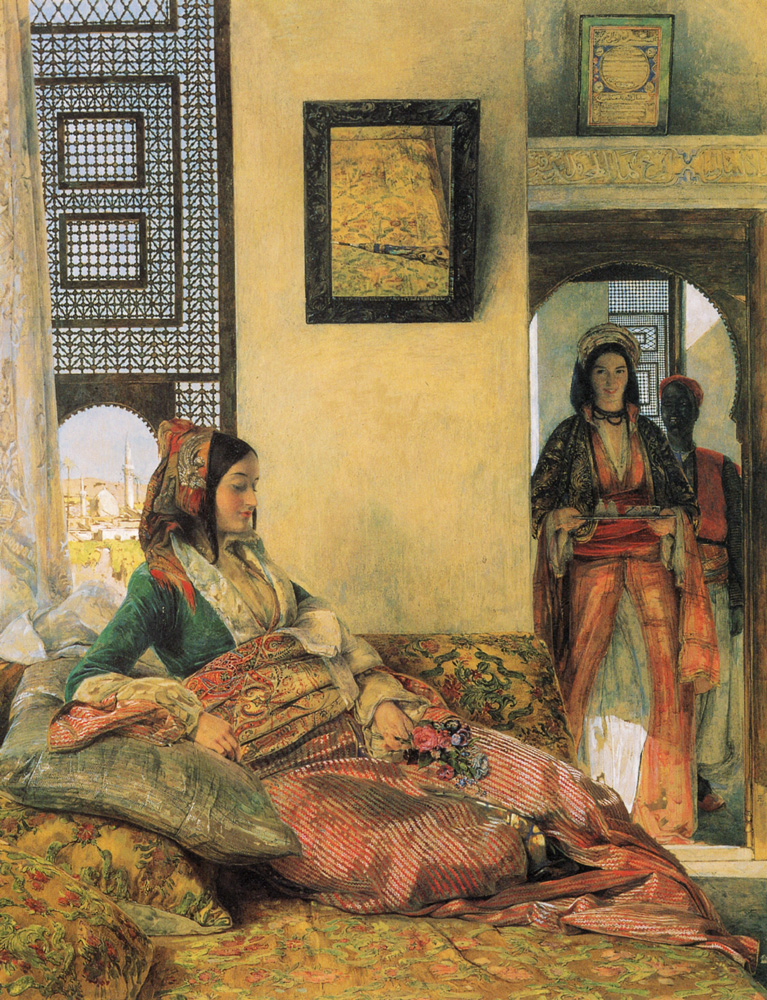
An Armenian lady, Cairo – The love missive, 46 × 35 cm, oil on panel, 1855. The young woman in the background was reworked as a standalone subject in The Coffee Bearer, two years later.

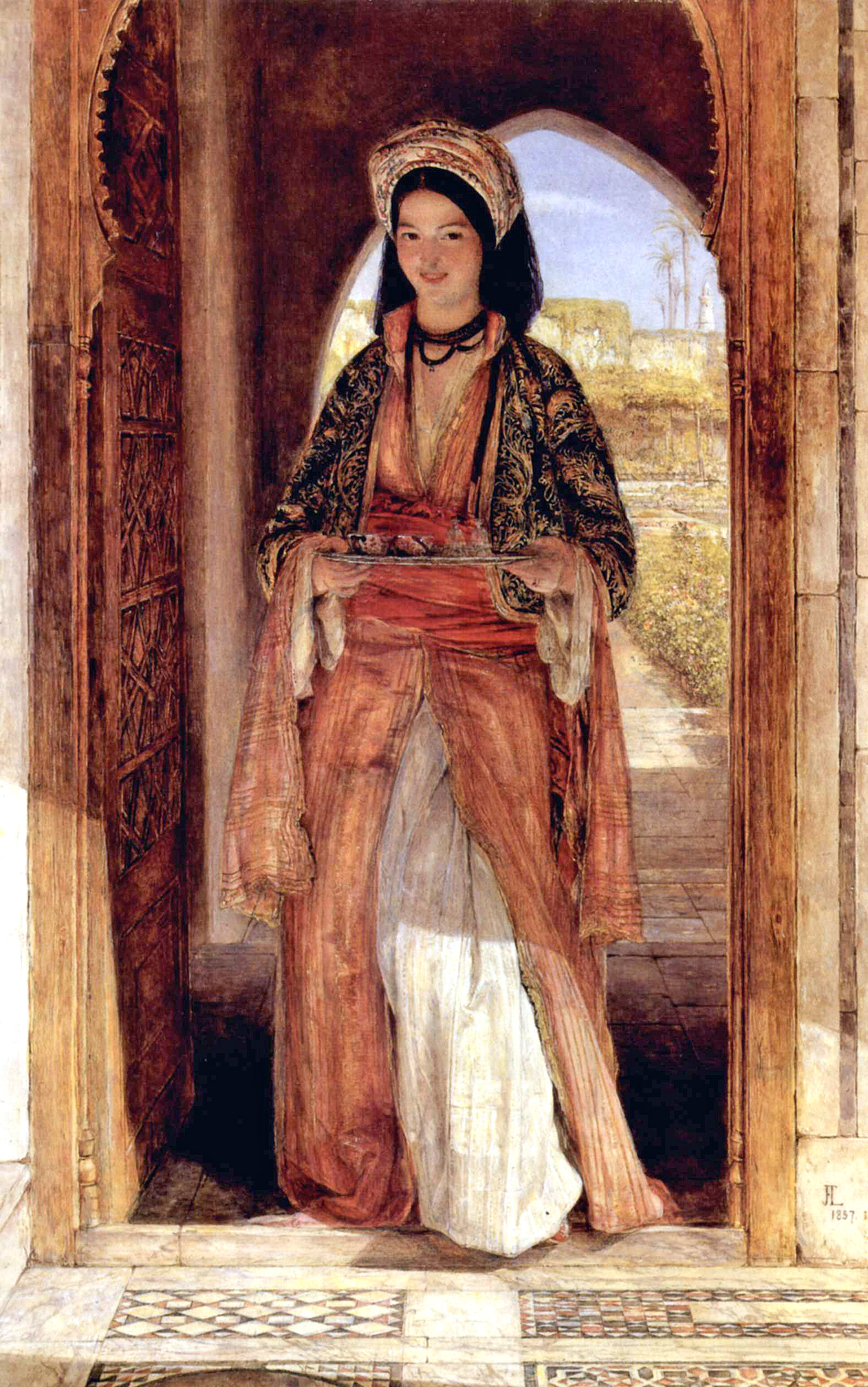
The Coffee Bearer, oil (1857)

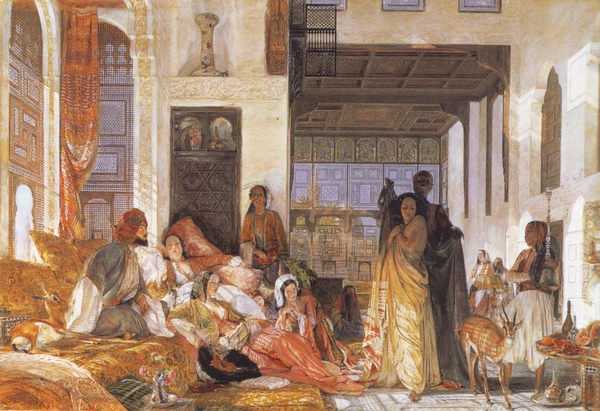
The Harem – Introduction of an Abyssinian Slave, 1860s version

In Egypt he made large numbers of precise drawings that he turned into paintings after his return to England in 1851. He lived in Walton-on-Thames from 1854 until his death. In 1850 his watercolour The Hareem (now in a private collection in Japan, and rather faded) was a huge hit when exhibited in London, and praised by John Ruskin and other critics. This is in fact the "only major work certainly completed" in Cairo before his return.

He continued to paint watercolours for most of the 1850s, before returning to painting with similar subjects and style in oils, which were quicker to produce and sold for better prices.

He wrote to a colleague: "Generally in spite of all my hard work, I find water colour to be thoroly [sic] unremunerative that I can stand it no longer—it is all, all always, rolling the stone up the hill—no rest, and such little pay!"

In the 1860s his usual practice was to paint two versions of the same composition, in oils (to exhibit at the Royal Academy) and also watercolour, trying to push the price of the latter up to approach that of the former. In his technique, "Independently of the Pre-Raphaelites, Lewis had evolved a similar method, applying colour with a minute touch on a white ground to produce a glowing jewel-like effect".

Lewis became an Associate of the Royal Academy (ARA) in 1859 and a member (an RA) in 1865, and was President of the Society of Painters in Water Colours from 1855, though this was just as he was abandoning the technique for oils. The Society did not allow members to exhibit works in oils, which Lewis now wanted to do, and he resigned in 1858.

Lewis wrote very little, even letters, and when he was required to address the watercolourists as their president at a dinner in 1855, he stood up and after a while sat down again without saying a word. Partly as a result of the absence of sources, no full biography was published until 2014. Lewis continued to paint and exhibit almost up to the end of his life, but in 1873 he seems to have suffered a crisis in his health from which he never recovered before his death on 15 August 1876. After being largely forgotten for decades, he became extremely fashionable, and expensive, from the 1970s and good works now fetch prices into the millions of dollars or pounds at auction.

== Works ==
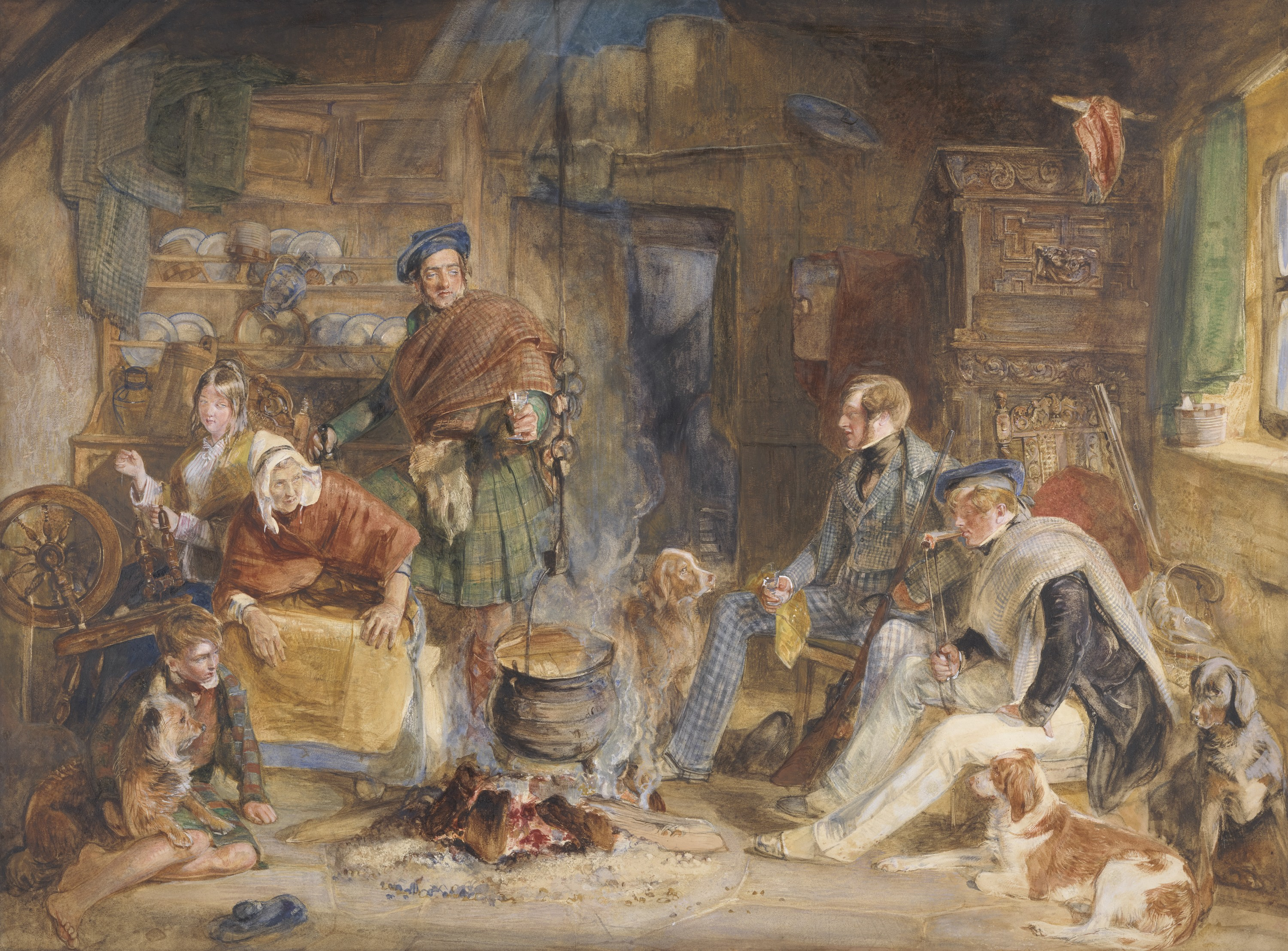
Highland Hospitality, 1832

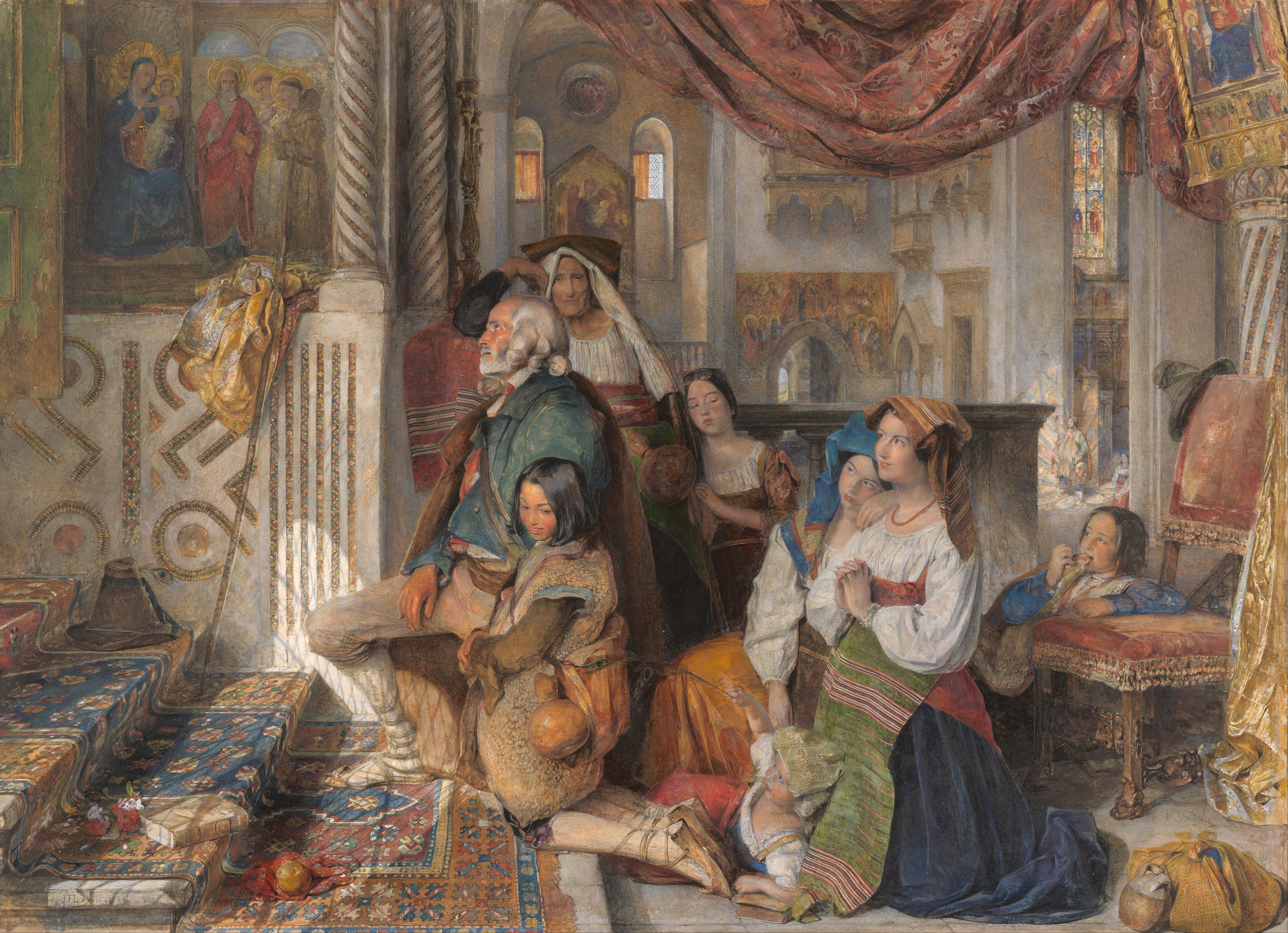
Roman Pilgrims, 1854

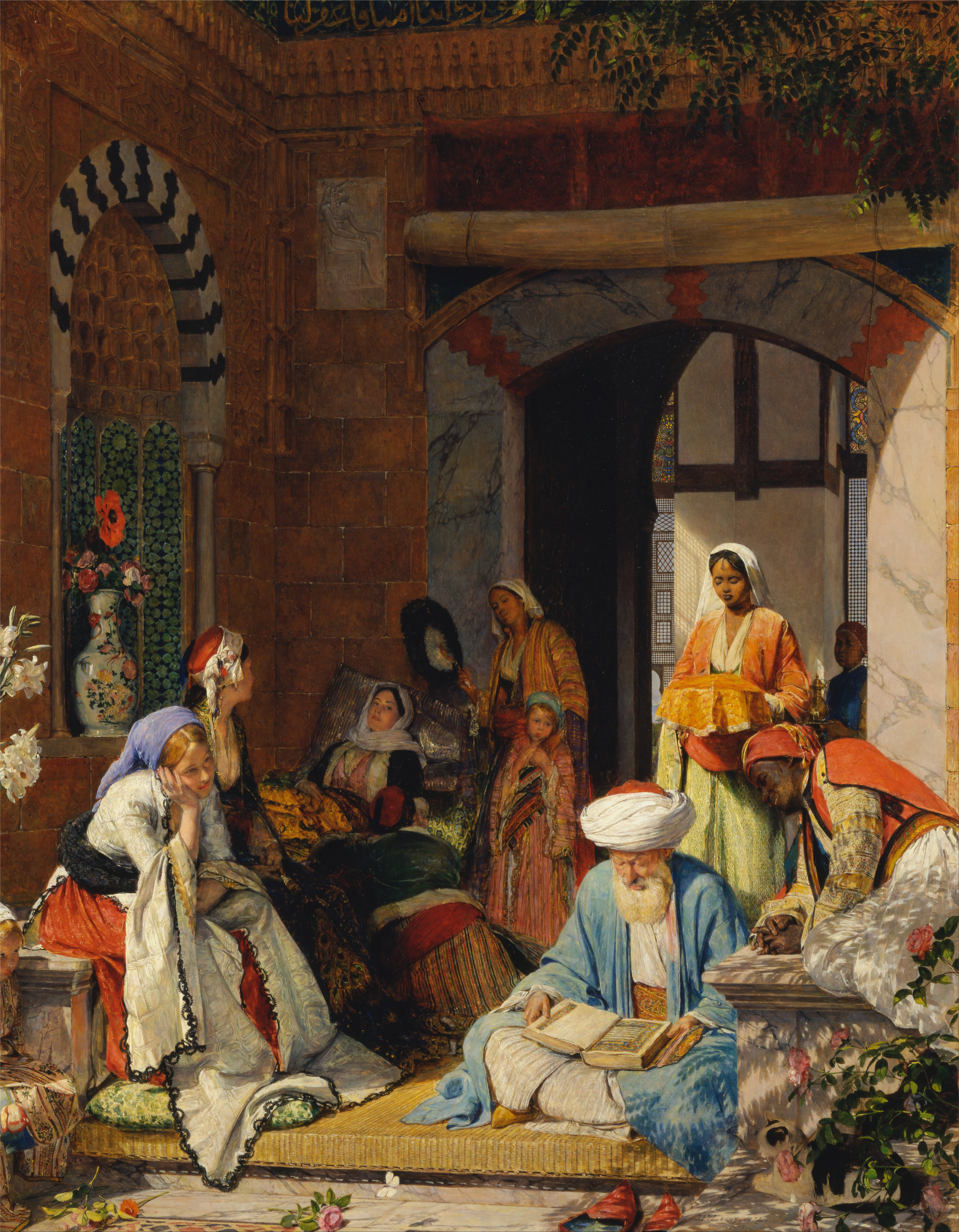
And the Prayer of Faith Shall Save the Sick, 1872

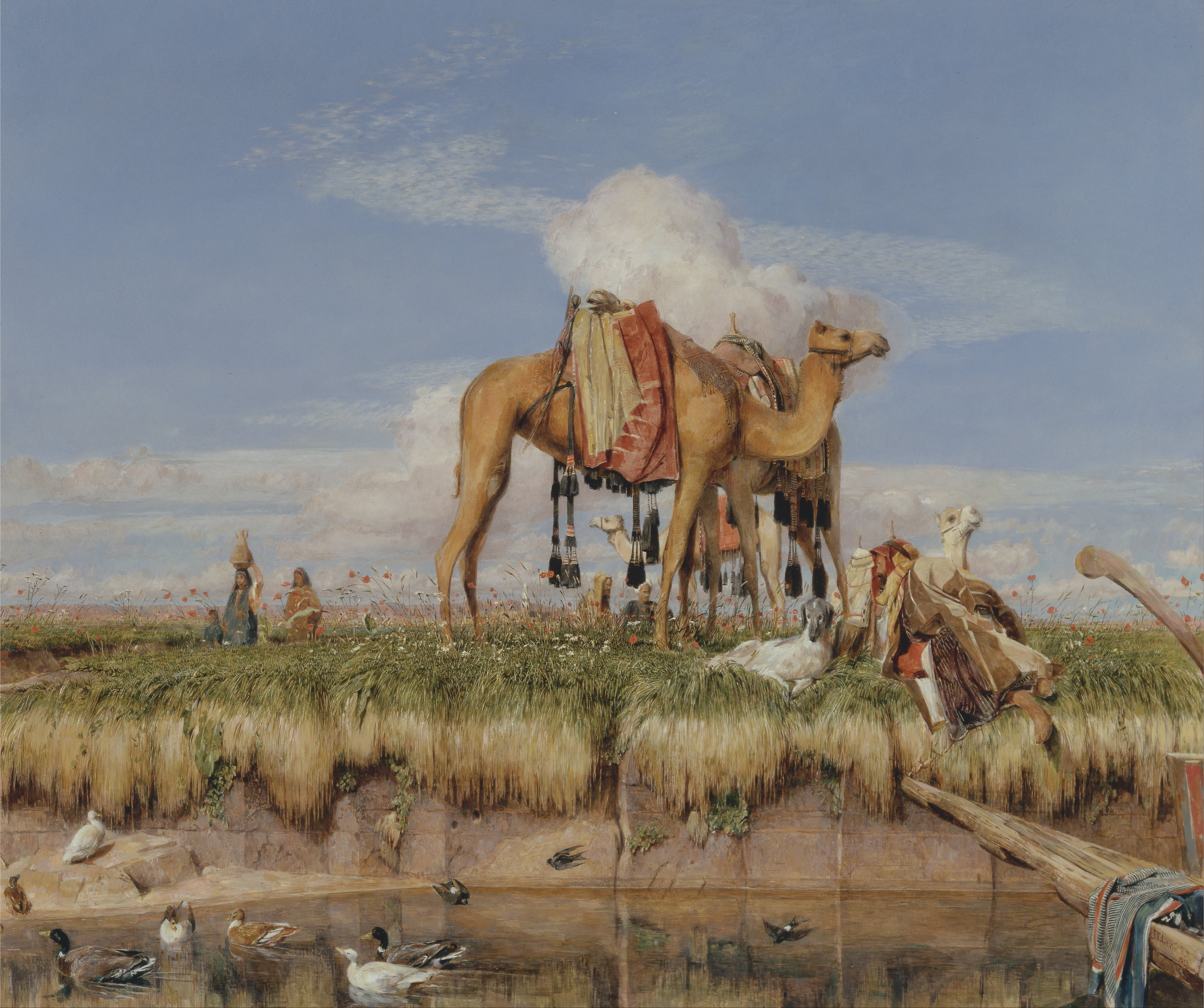
On the Banks of the Nile, 1876

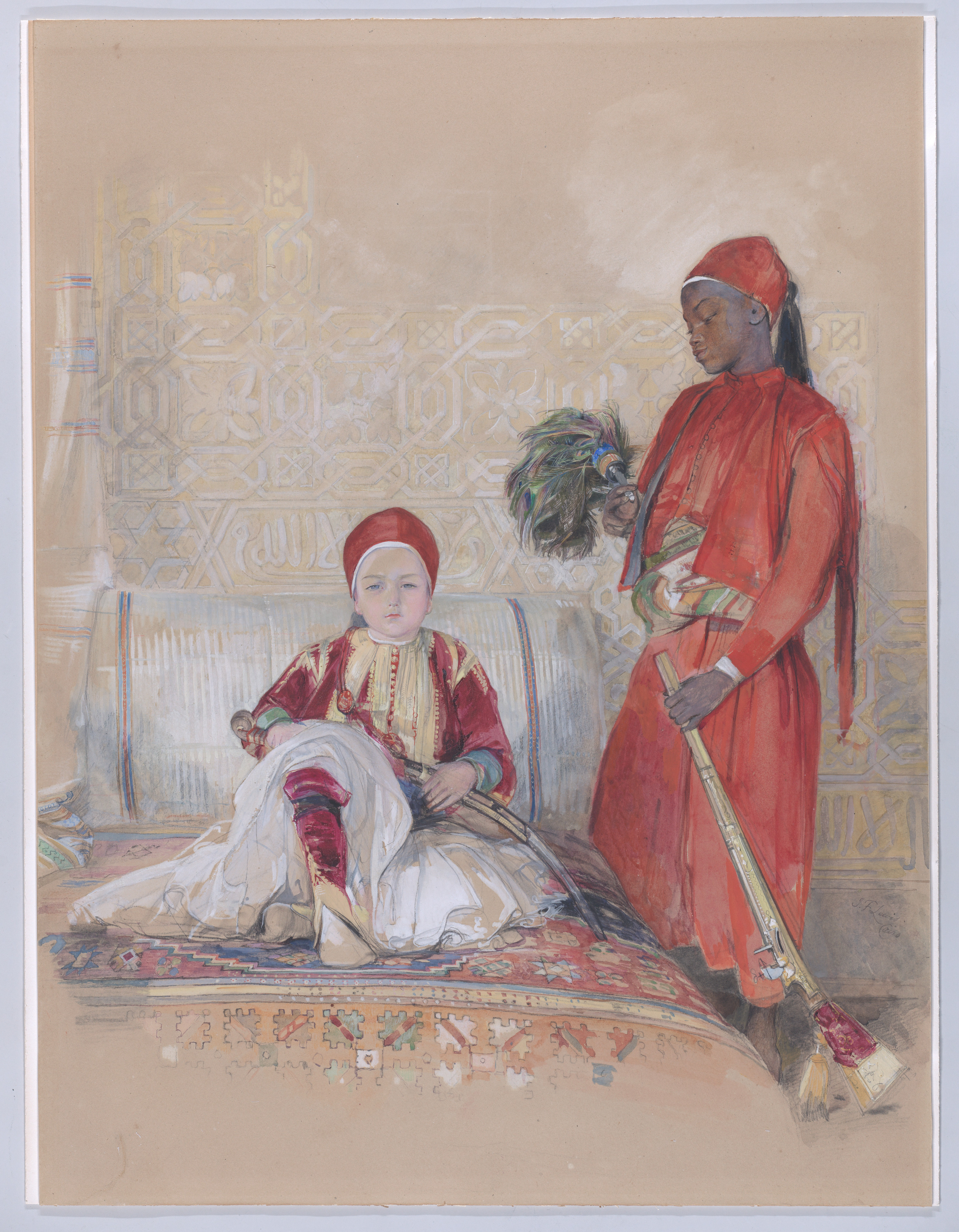
Iskander Bey (Mohamed el Mahdi el faransawi) and his servant ca.1848

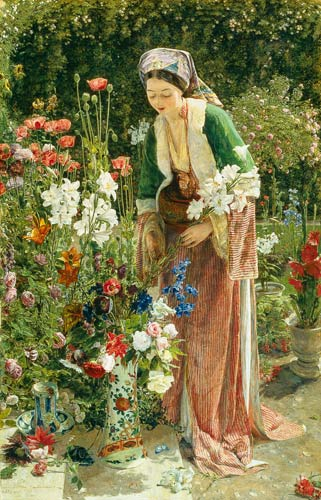
In the Beys Garden, 1865

== See also ==
- List of Orientalist artists
