= Thenford =

Village in Northamptonshire, England

Coordinates: 52.071°N 1.244°W

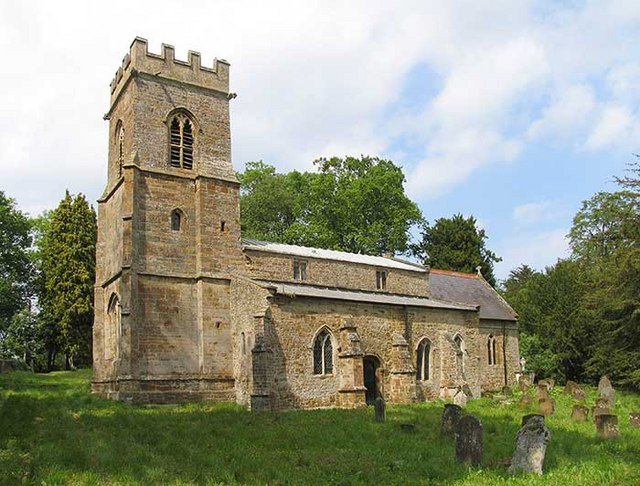
- St Mary's parish church

- Location within Northamptonshire
- Population: 74 (2001 Census)
- OS grid reference: SP5141
- Civil parish: Thenford
- Unitary authority: West Northamptonshire
- Ceremonial county: Northamptonshire
- Region: East Midlands
- Country: England
- Sovereign state: United Kingdom
- Post town: Banbury
- Postcode district: OX17
- Dialling code: 01295
- Police: Northamptonshire
- Fire: Northamptonshire
- Ambulance: East Midlands
- UK Parliament: South Northamptonshire

Thenford is a village and civil parish about 5 miles (8 km) northwest of the market town of Brackley in West Northamptonshire, England, and 4 miles (6.4 km) east of Banbury in nearby Oxfordshire. The 2001 Census recorded the parish population as 74. At the 2011 Census the population of the village remained less than 100 and is included in the civil parish of Middleton Cheney.

== Archaeology ==
Traces have been found of a Neolithic and Bronze Age settlement east of the village. Neolithic artefacts found include four flint arrowheads and a fragment of a polished stone axe southeast of the village. Bronze Age artefacts found include a middle Bronze Age palstave and a late Bronze Age hoard at Thenford Hill Farm north of the village that included two swords, four spearheads, two rings and other bronze objects.

Traces have been found also of an Iron Age settlement in the north of the parish on Arbury or Arberry hill. It was a fortified farmstead with a circular rampart 490 feet (150 m) in diameter. Fragments of Iron Age and Roman pottery have been found in the eastern part of the site.

East of the village are the remains of an Iron Age settlement and Roman villa dating from 1st to the 4th centuries AD. The site was developed in four phases, with the villa itself being built about AD 300. It had six rooms, one of which had a fine Roman mosaic. Later extensions to the villa included a bath house. In the 1820s coins from the reigns of Tetricus (271–274) to Constans (circa 323) were found in the walled garden of Thenford House. A few years later skeletons were found in the same garden. The villa site was excavated from 1971 to 1973. and is now a scheduled monument. The mosaic is preserved in Thenford House.

Early in the 19th century a Roman funerary urn containing ashes was found in St Mary's parish churchyard. Nearby were found "a medal of Constans", plus tesserae suggesting that a building with a mosaic floor had been in the vicinity. Other Roman era sites have been found in the parish.

Before 1830 a Saxon cemetery was found west of the village. Seven skeletons and a number of earthenware vessels were found in a barrow. The site has since been quarried, leaving no trace of the barrow. The only artefacts known to survive are one blackware vessel and an iron knife.

== History ==
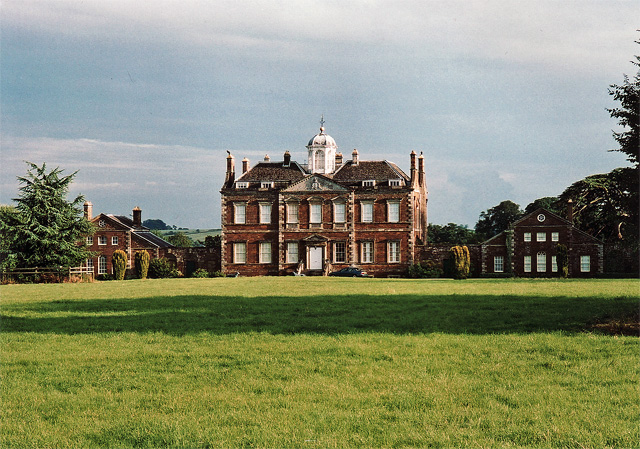
Thenford House, built 1761–65

Thenford's name is derived from the Old English for "Ford of the Thegns".

Thenford Manor House was near the parish church. Its origin was medieval, and in the 18th century was described as party Elizabethan. It was demolished probably when the current Thenford House was built.

Thenford House is a Georgian country house built between 1761 and 1765 for Michael Wodhull. It is a Grade I listed building. It is currently the home of Lord Heseltine. In its grounds is a large arboretum that has become one of the most important private collections in the United Kingdom. It is open to the public four times a year.

Thenford had a watermill west of the village and a windmill on a mound north of the village. The watermill was demolished in the 20th century but traces of its foundations, leat and mill pond survive. The windmill mound was about 66 feet (20 m) in diameter and still existed in 1947. It has since been destroyed.

Thenford Inclosure Act 1766
- Act of Parliament
- Parliament of Great Britain
- Long title: An Act for dividing and enclosing the Common Fields, Common Pastures, Common Meadows, Common Grounds, and Waste Grounds, of and in the Manor and Parish of Thenford, otherwise Fenford, in the County of Northampton.
- Citation: 6 Geo. 3. c. 9 Pr.
- Territorial extent: Great Britain

Dates
- Royal assent: 18 March 1766
- Commencement: 17 December 1765 (Note: Start of session.)

Status: Current legislation

An open field system of farming prevailed in Thenford until the 18th century. Traces of ridge and furrow can be traced in much of the parish, and especially from the air. Parliament passed an inclosure act for the parish, the Thenford Inclosure Act 1766 (6 Geo. 3. c. 9 Pr.).

== Parish church ==
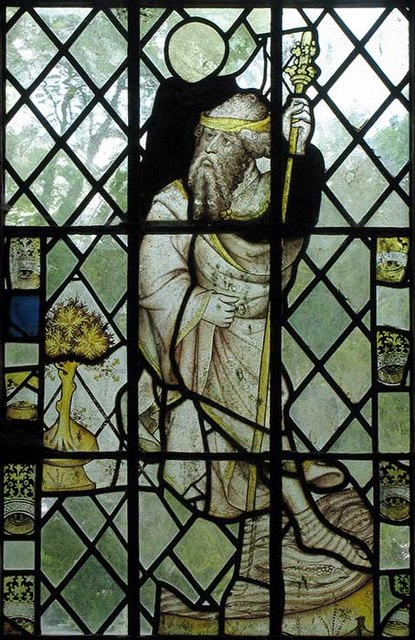
15th-century stained glass of St Christopher in St Mary's church

The Church of England parish church of Saint Mary was built in about 1200, extensively rebuilt in about 1300 and has a Perpendicular Gothic west tower and chancel screen. The south arcade is of two bays. The north arcade is of three bays and was built about 1300. The east window of the north aisle has fragments of early 15th-century Medieval stained glass representing St Christopher, and St Anne with St Mary. Also in the north aisle is an early 17th-century monument to Fulk Woodhull, who died in 1613. He is represented by a recumbent stone effigy in a recess framed by composite order columns. St Mary's north porch was rebuilt in 1885.

The church is a Grade I listed building.

St Mary's parish is a member of the Chenderit Benefice, which includes the parishes of Chacombe, Greatworth, Marston St. Lawrence, Middleton Cheney and Warkworth.

== Sources ==
- Pevsner, Nikolaus; Cherry, Bridget (1973) [1961]. Northamptonshire. The Buildings of England. Harmondsworth: Penguin Books. pp. 425–426. ISBN 0-14-071022-1.
- RCHME, ed. (1982). An Inventory of the Historical Monuments in the County of Northamptonshire. Vol. 4, Archaeological Sites in South-West Northamptonshire. London: Her Majesty's Stationery Office. pp. 143–145.
