= Thenford House =

Grade I listed house in South Northamptonshire, United Kingdom

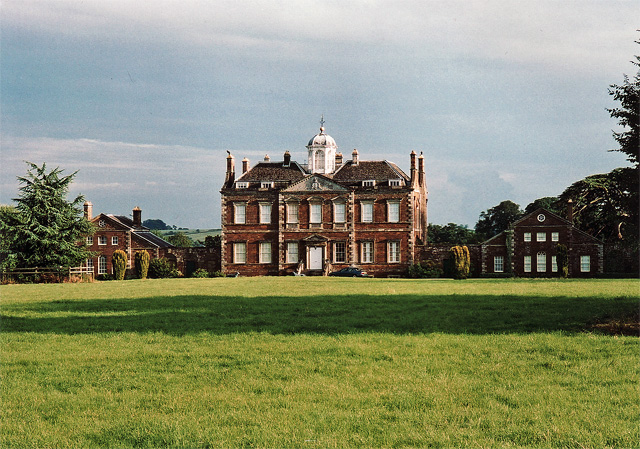

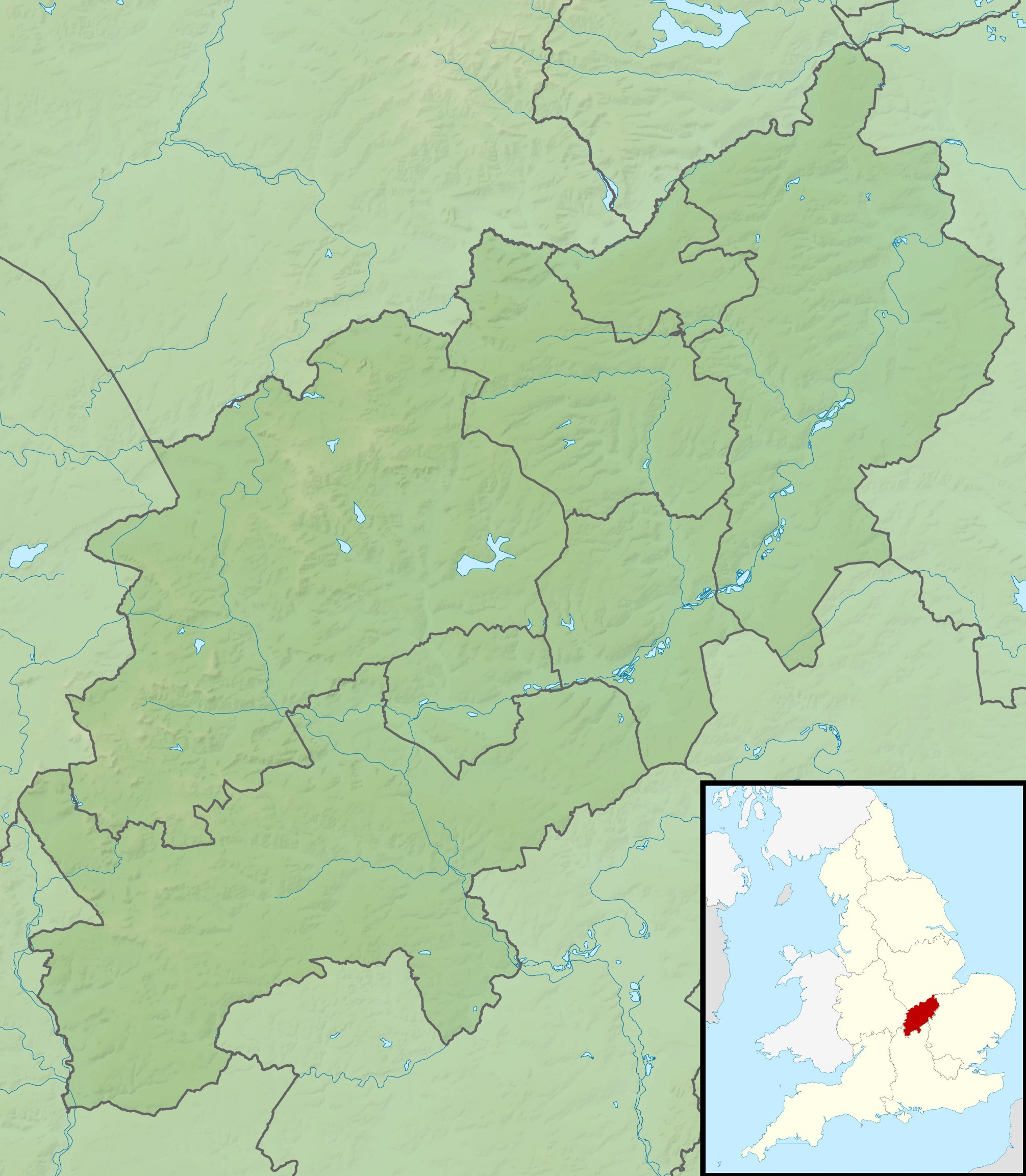
- Location within Northamptonshire
- 52.0721°N 1.24°W
- Type: House
- Location: Thenford, Northamptonshire

History
- Built: 1761-1765

Site notes
- Architectural style: Palladian
- Owner: Michael Heseltine

Listed Building – Grade I
- Official name: Thenford House
- Designated: 11 September 1953
- Reference no.: 1190951

Listed Building – Grade II
- Official name: Thenford House Water Tank
- Designated: 22 May 1985
- Reference no.: 1041125

Listed Building – Grade II
- Official name: Thenford House Pump
- Designated: 22 May 1985
- Reference no.: 1371505

Listed Building – Grade II
- Official name: Home Farmhouse, Thenford
- Designated: 22 May 1985
- Reference no.: 1190938

Listed Building – Grade II
- Official name: Manor Farmhouse, Thenford
- Designated: 22 May 1985
- Reference no.: 1190946

Thenford House, Thenford, Northamptonshire, England is an 18th-century country house built for Michael Wodhull, the bibliophile and translator. Wodhull's architect is unknown. The style is Palladian although with earlier Carolean echoes which led Pevsner to describe it as "decidedly conservative for its date". Construction took place between 1761 and 1765. Since the 1970s, the house has been the country home of Michael Heseltine who has constructed a notable arboretum in the grounds. Thenford House is a Grade I listed building.

== History ==
Michael Wodhull was born in Thenford, Northamptonshire in 1740. His parents were wealthy landowners and he never worked. His principal occupations were book collecting and the translation of Ancient Greek texts. In 1761, aged 21, he began the building of a new house at Thenford, to replace the Elizabethan manor house. By 1765 the house was complete. In the same year Wodhull married Catherine Milcah, daughter of a Warwickshire vicar. Wodhull died without heirs in 1816 and the Thenford estate passed to his wife's sister.

By descent, the estate passed to the Severne family who owned the house until the end of the 19th century. In 1861 John Edmund Severne was High Sheriff of Northamptonshire. In the 20th century, the house was in the possession of the Summers family, until the death in 1976 of Spencer Summers, who also served as High Sheriff for the county in the year before his death.

Michael Heseltine and his wife Anne bought the house and 400 acres of gardens and farmland from Sir Spencer's widow in 1976, and moved into the house in 1977. Since that time, the Heseltines have developed the house and the estate, most notably by the planting of an important arboretum. A summerhouse, dating from 1981 to 1982 is by Quinlan Terry.

== Architecture and description ==
Nikolaus Pevsner, in his Buildings of England, notes that the house is "of fine quality but decidedly conservative for its date". Both he, and Historic England suggest that the style is more of the 1650s–1680s, rather than that fashionable at the time of the house's construction in the mid-18th century. Historic England suggests that Woodhull is likely to have been his own architect, perhaps assisted by a local draughtsman. The house is built to a double pile plan, of two storeys with attics and basements. Side pavilions are joined to the main block by screening walls. The roof is topped by a cupola. It is constructed of Hornton stone with limestone dressings.

The house is a Grade I listed building. A water tank, with a date of 1765 and bearing the initials MW, and a 19th-century pump in the grounds have their own Grade II listings. Ancillary estate buildings also have Grade II listings, including the Home and Manor farmhouses.

== Sources ==
- Bailey, Bruce; Pevsner, Nikolaus; Cherry, Bridget (2013). Northamptonshire. The Buildings Of England. New Haven, US and London: Yale University Press. ISBN 978-0-300-18507-2. OCLC 964790363.
- Heseltine, Anne; Heseltine, Michael (2017). Thenford: The Creation of an English Garden. London: Head of Zeus. ISBN 978-1-784-97973-7. OCLC 999361512.
- Pevsner, Nikolaus; Cherry, Bridget (1973) [1961]. Northamptonshire. The Buildings Of England. London: Penguin Books. ISBN 978-0-140-71022-9. OCLC 555057698.
- Streat, Raymond (1987). Marguerite Dupree (ed.). Lancashire and Whitehall: The Diary of Sir Raymond Streat. Vol. 2. Manchester: Manchester University Press. ISBN 978-0-719-02391-0. OCLC 796012866.
