= Stigmella mespilicola =

Scientific classification
- Kingdom: Animalia
- Phylum: Arthropoda
- Class: Insecta
- Order: Lepidoptera
- Family: Nepticulidae
- Genus: Stigmella
- Species: S. mespilicola

Binomial name
- Stigmella mespilicola (Frey, 1856)

Synonyms
- Nepticula mespilicola Frey, 1856; Nepticula ariella Herrich-Schaffer, 1860

Species of moth

Stigmella mespilicola is a moth of the family Nepticulidae. It is found from Germany to the Iberian Peninsula, Italy and Macedonia and from Great Britain to Ukraine.

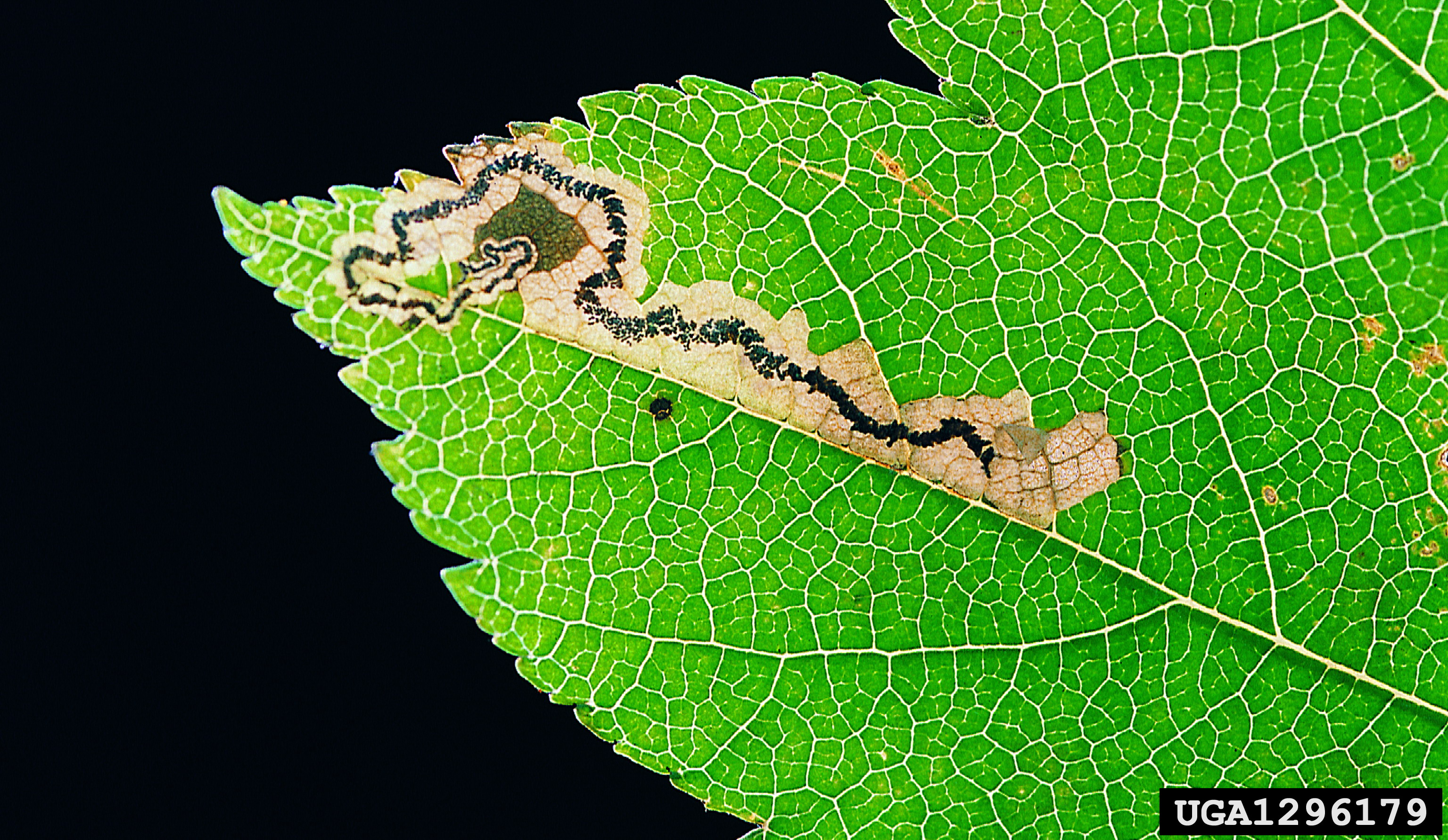
Stigmella mespilicola mine

The larvae feed on Amelachier parviflora, Cotoneaster racemiflorus, Cotoneaster salicifolia, Sorbus aria and Sorbus torminalis. They mine the leaves of their host plant.
