= William Evans (watercolourist) =

English painter

William Evans (1798–1877) was an English water-colour painter.

== Life ==
Evans was born at Eton on 4 December 1798 to Samuel Evans, a landscape painter originally from Flintshire who had settled at Windsor. Samuel Evans was selected to teach drawing to the daughters of George III, and eventually became a drawing master at Eton College. There are some views of North Wales and Windsor by him which have been engraved. He left Eton around 1818 for Droxford, Hampshire, where he died in around 1835.

William Evans studied at Eton, and originally studied medicine, but eventually turned to art and became a pupil of William Collins, R.A.. In 1818, Dr. Keate appointed him drawing master at Eton in his father's place. He was elected an associate of the Old Society of Painters in Watercolours on 11 February 1828, in which year he exhibited drawings of Windsor, Eton, Thames fishermen, Barmouth, and Llanberis. On 7 June 1830, he was elected a member of the society and continued to be a constant contributor to their exhibitions.

He made some large drawings of the Eton "Montem", which were engraved. Evans continued to teach drawing at Eton until 1837 when his wife died, and he made up his mind to move to London. At that time the oppidans at Eton were still lodged in houses kept by ladies, known as "dames", a system which placed the boys under little to no control. It being Dr. Hawtrey's wish to place the boarding houses under the charge of men connected with the work of the school, the Rev. Thomas Carter, the Rev. Edward Coleridge, and the Rev. George Selwyn persuaded Evans to take one of these houses and retain his former position as drawing master. This Evans did in 1840, working with great energy.

Evans died after some years of ill-health at Eton on New Year's Eve in 1877. He was succeeded in the post of drawing master to the school by his son, Samuel T. G. Evans, also a member of the Society of Painters in Watercolours, and in the management of the boarding house by his daughter, Jane Evans.
