= Frederick Christian Lewis =

English painter (1779–1856)

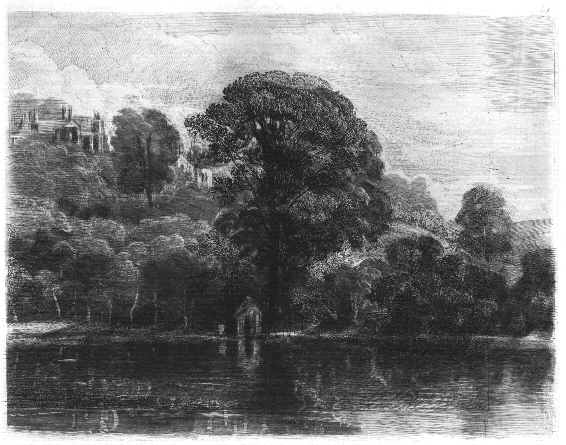
Endsleigh Cottage c1840

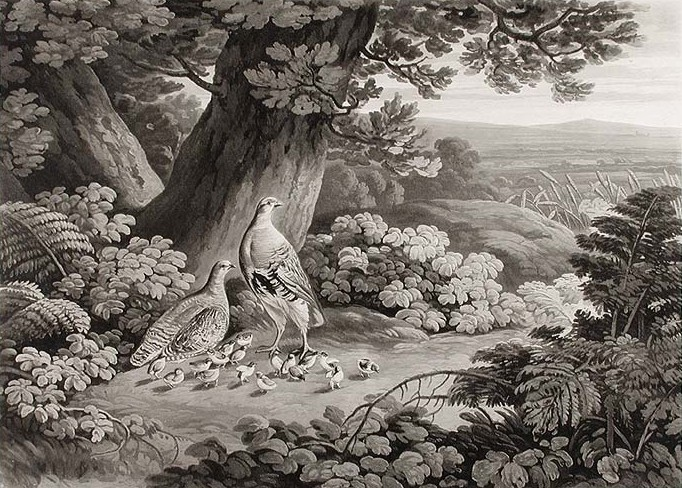
Partridges 1806 after Philip Reinagle

Frederick Christian Lewis (1779–1856) was an English etcher, aquatint and stipple engraver, landscape and portrait painter and the brother of Charles Lewis (1786–1836).

== Life ==
He studied under J. C. Stadler and in the schools of the Royal Academy and aquatinted most of Thomas Girtin's etchings of Paris, 1803. He made transcripts of drawings by the Old masters for William Young Ottley's Italian School of Design 1808-12 and executed plates for the publisher John Chamberlaine's Original Designs of the most celebrated Masters in the Royal Collection, 1812. He engraved Sir Thomas Lawrence's crayon portraits and was engraver of drawings to Princess Charlotte, Prince Leopold, George IV, William IV, and Queen Victoria. He also painted landscapes, mainly of Devonshire scenery and published several volumes of plates depicting the Devonshire rivers between 1821 and 1843, as well as etchings of the Scenery of the Rivers of England and Wales 1845–7.

Lewis transformed numerous natural history paintings by Philip Reinagle into aquatints. His superlative skills as engraver led to frequent commissions from Royalty, and to his contribution to J. M. W. Turner's Liber Studiorum, a collection of seventy-one etchings with mezzotint, greatly influencing landscape painting.

== Family ==
Lewis's son, John Frederick Lewis (1805–1876), was a painter of Italian, Spanish, and Oriental themes.

Another son, also named Frederick Christian Lewis (1813–1875), studied under Sir Thomas Lawrence, went to India, 1834, and painted pictures of durbars for native princes, engraved by his father, and published in England. He died at Genoa.

A third son Charles George Lewis, was known as an engraver.

== Sources ==
- "Lewis, Frederick Christian" . Dictionary of National Biography. London: Smith, Elder & Co. 1885–1900.

Attribution

This article incorporates text from a publication now in the public domain: "Lewis, Frederick Christian". Dictionary of National Biography. London: Smith, Elder & Co. 1885–1900.
