= Francis Bedford (bookbinder) =

English bookbinder (1799–1833)

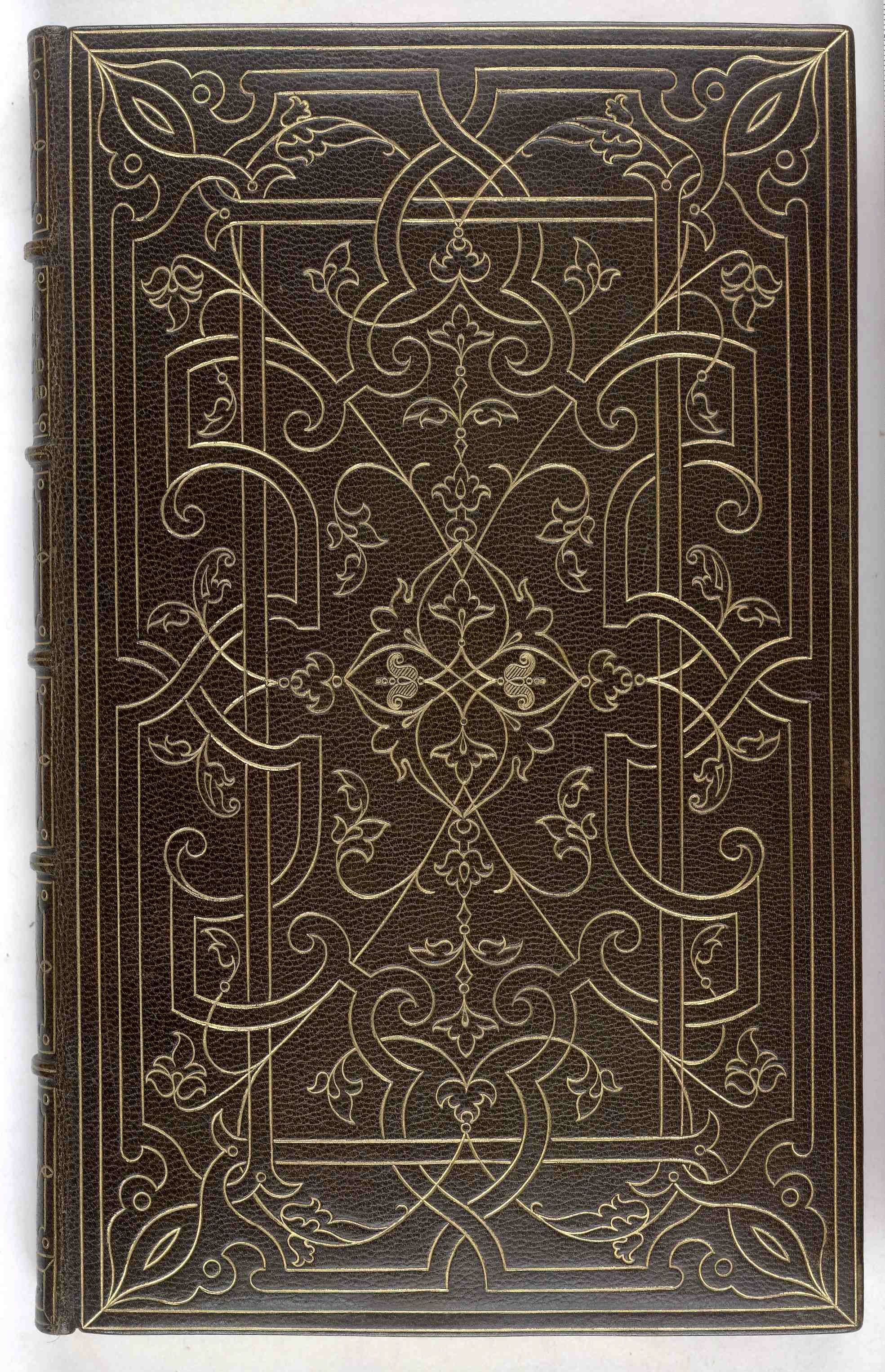
Bookbinding by Bedford in the British Library collection

Francis Bedford (18 June 1799 – 8 June 1883) was an English bookbinder.

== Life ==
Bedford was born at Paddington, London, on 18 June 1799; his father is believed to have been a courier attached to the establishment of George III. At an early age he was sent to school in Yorkshire, and on his return to London his guardian, Henry Bower of 38 Great Marlborough Street, apprenticed him in 1817 to a bookbinder named Haigh, in Poland Street, Oxford Street. Only a part of his time was served with Haigh, and in 1822 he was transferred to a binder named Finlay, also of Poland Street, with whom his indentures were completed.

At the end of his apprenticeship Bedford entered the workshop of one of the leading bookbinders of the day, Charles Lewis, of 35 Duke Street, St. James's, with whom he worked until the death of his employer, and subsequently managed the business for Lewis's widow.

Bedford attracted the notice of William Bentinck, 4th Duke of Portland, who became a patron and friend. In 1841 Bedford, who had by then left Mrs. Lewis's establishment, entered into partnership with John Clarke of 61 Frith Street, Soho, who had a reputation for binding books in tree-marbled calf. Clarke and Bedford carried on their business in Frith Street until 1850, when the partnership was dissolved.

In 1851 Bedford went to the Cape of Good Hope for the benefit of his health, where he remained for a time, the expenses of his journey being defrayed by the Duke of Portland, and on his return to England he established himself in Blue Anchor Yard, York Street, Westminster. He later added 91 York Street to his premises, and remained there until his death, which took place at his residence at Shepherd's Bush, Hammersmith, on 8 June 1883. Bedford was twice married, but had no children by either of his wives.

== Works ==
Bedford respected margins, and was a skilful mender of damaged leaves. Many of his productions were imitations of the major French bookbinders of past centuries, for example the bindings of Samuel Rogers's Poems and Italy, of which he bound several copies in Morocco inlaid with coloured leathers and covered with gold tooling in the style of Antoine Michel Padeloup.

Bedford himself considered that an edition of Dante, which he bound in brown Morocco and tooled with a Grolier pattern, was his chef d'oeuvre, and wished it placed in his coffin; but his request was not complied with, and it was sold. He obtained prize medals at several English and French exhibitions. His books were disposed of by Sotheby, Wilkinson, & Hodge, in March 1884.
