= Frederick Tayler =

English cricketer

Frederick Ernest Tayler (18 July 1889 – 30 April 1954) was an English cricketer who played for Warwickshire in 1910 and Gloucestershire in 1911 as a right-handed batsman. He was born at Cold Aston, Gloucestershire (sometimes called Aston Blank) and died there as well.
