= Henry William Banks Davis =

English painter (1833–1914)

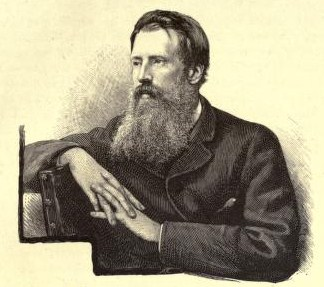
- Portrait of H W B Davis (unknown artist)
- Born: 1833; Finchley, London
- Died: 2 December 1914 (aged 80–81)
- Known for: Landscape art, Animal painter

Henry William Banks Davis RA (1833 – 1 December 1914) was a popular English landscape and animal painter, noted for his pastoral scenes, often populated with cattle and other farm animals.

== Life and works ==
He studied and exhibited at the Royal Academy, becoming an associate in 1873 and Royal Academician in 1877, and where he was awarded two silver medals.

Early works were influenced by the Pre-Raphaelites but he later evolved a more individual style and worked on a larger scale. He achieved popularity and his art commanded high prices during his lifetime.

=== Paintings ===
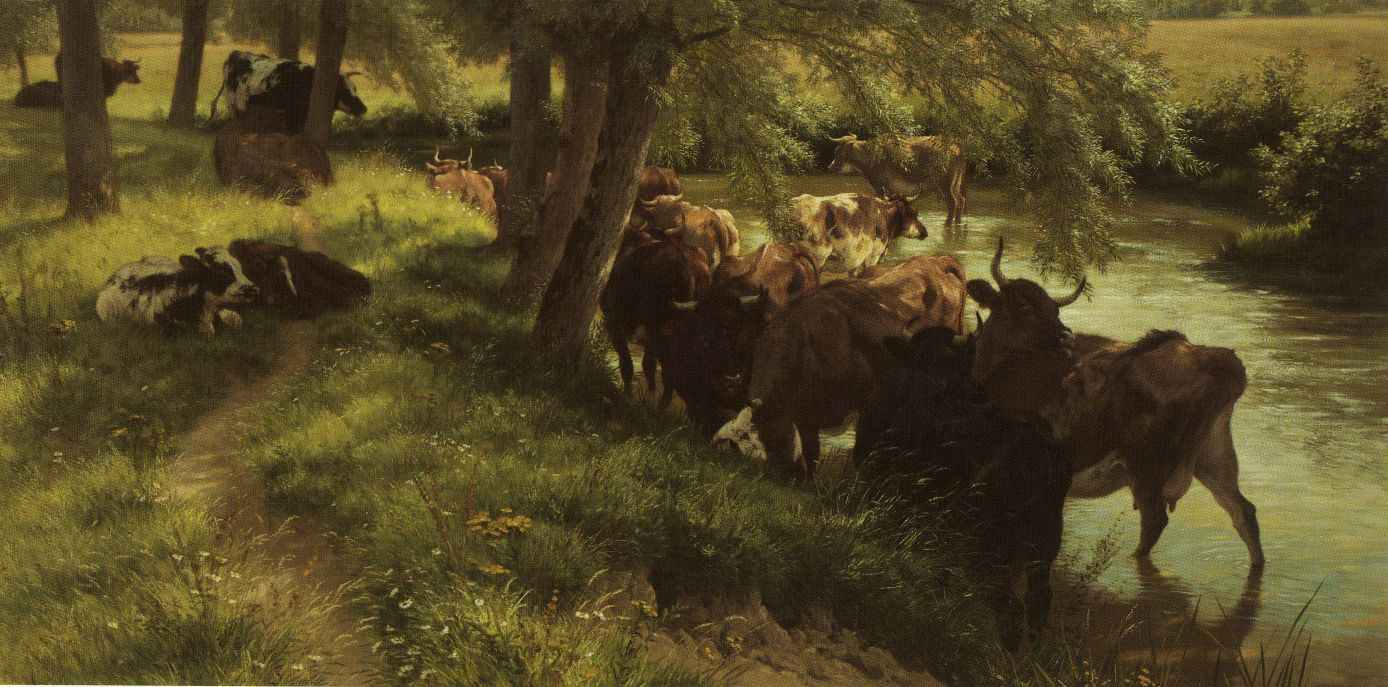
A Shady Spot on a Summers Day (Oil on canvas, 1878)

- A Placid Morning on the Wye.
- A Shady Spot on a Summers Day.
- A Spring Morning, 1866.
- An Orchard in Wales.
- Approaching Night, 1899 (Tate Gallery).
- Foxhounds in a Landscape.
- Gathering the Flocks, Loch Maree, 1883.
- Landscape.
- Orchard with Sheep in Spring (in Wales).
- Portrait of a Jack Russell Terrier (in Regency Interior).
- Returning to the Fold, 1880 (Tate Gallery).
- Studies of a Welsh Cobb.
- Sunset over a Landscape.
- Towards Evening in the Forest.
- Wooded River Landscape with Cattle Watering.
- Mother and Son.
