= Roger Payne (bookbinder) =

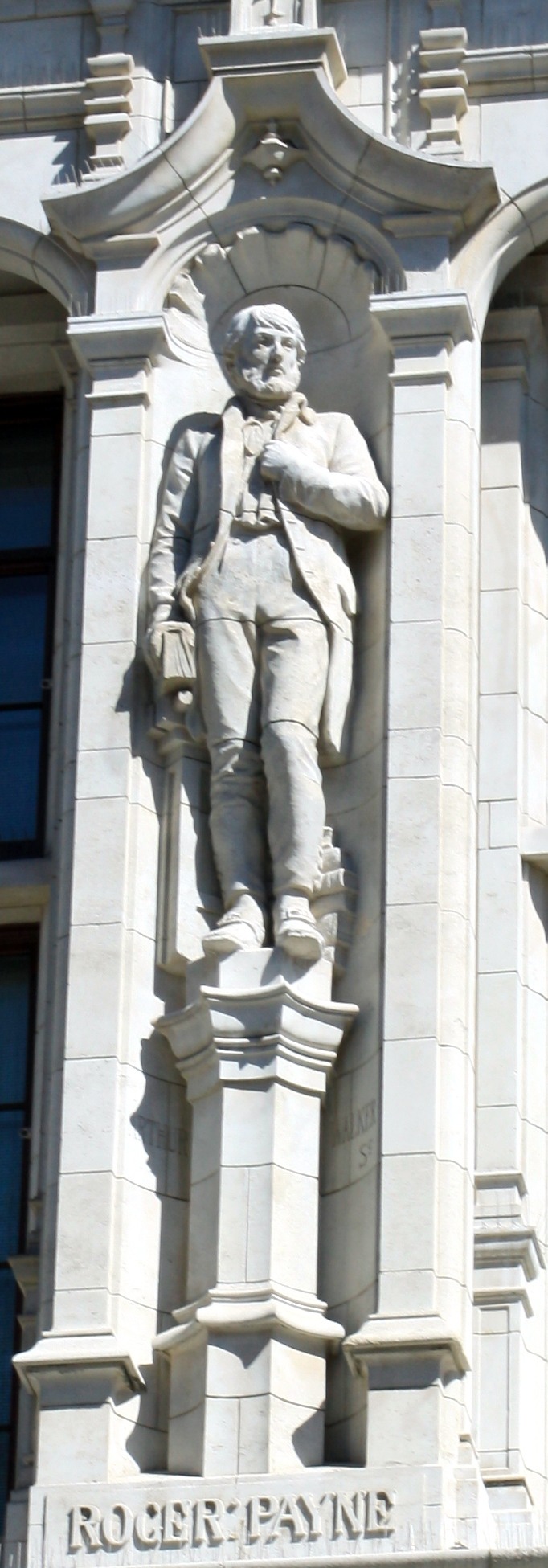
Statue of Roger Payne on the Victoria and Albert Museum, London

Roger Payne (1739 – 20 November 1797) was an English bookbinder, thought to have originated a new style.

== Life ==
Payne was born at Windsor, learned binding from Joseph Pote of Eton, and is said to have come to London around 1766. He worked for a short time for Thomas Osborne in Gray's Inn. By 1770 he was able to set up in business for himself as a bookbinder, near Leicester Square, with the support of Thomas Payne (not closely related). He was then joined by his brother Thomas, who attended to the forwarding department, while Roger concentrated on the finishing and decoration of volumes.

After a time, however, the brothers parted, and Payne, later in life, took as his fellow-worker Richard Wier, whose wife became known as a repairer and restorer of old books. Drink and quarrels broke up this partnership.

Payne died in Duke's Court, St Martin's Lane, London, on 20 November 1797, and was buried in the churchyard of St. Martin's-in-the-Fields, at the expense of his old friend Thomas Payne.

== Works ==
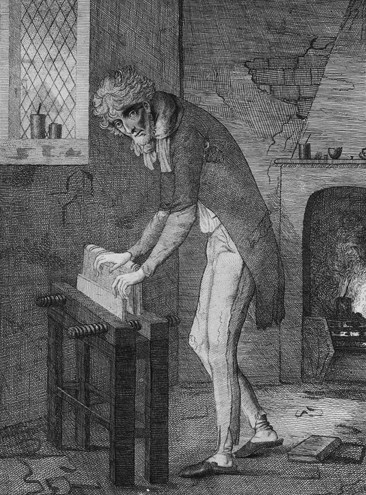
Roger Payne, at work

Payne, considered by some to have originated a new style of bookbinding, was influenced by the work of Samuel Mearne and other binders of the end of the 17th century. His most significant work was executed either in Russia leather or in straight-grained Morocco, usually of a dark blue, bright red, or olive colour. The end papers were usually purple or some other plain colour.

Payne's main patrons were Earl Spencer, the Duke of Devonshire, Colonel Thomas Stanley, and Clayton Mordaunt Cracherode; the books he bound for Lord Spencer went to the John Rylands Library at Manchester. A large-paper copy of Robert Potter's translation of Æschylus, printed at Glasgow in 1795, in which are contained John Flaxman's original drawings, bound in blue Morocco, has been called Payne's masterpiece. Other noted works were: Thomas East's edition of the Storye of Kynge Arthur, bound in red Morocco, and the Genoa edition of Tasso's Gierusalemme Liberata, 1590, in olive Morocco (British Library); and a copy of the First Folio of Shakespeare, 1623, bound in Russia, once in the Britwell Court Library. The latter copy is now owned by Loyola Marymount University in Los Angeles, California.

== Notes ==
Attribution

This article incorporates text from a publication now in the public domain: Lee, Sidney, ed. (1895). "Payne, Roger". Dictionary of National Biography. Vol. 44. London: Smith, Elder & Co.
