= Freemasons' Hall, Edinburgh =

Coordinates: 55°57′09″N 3°12′09″W

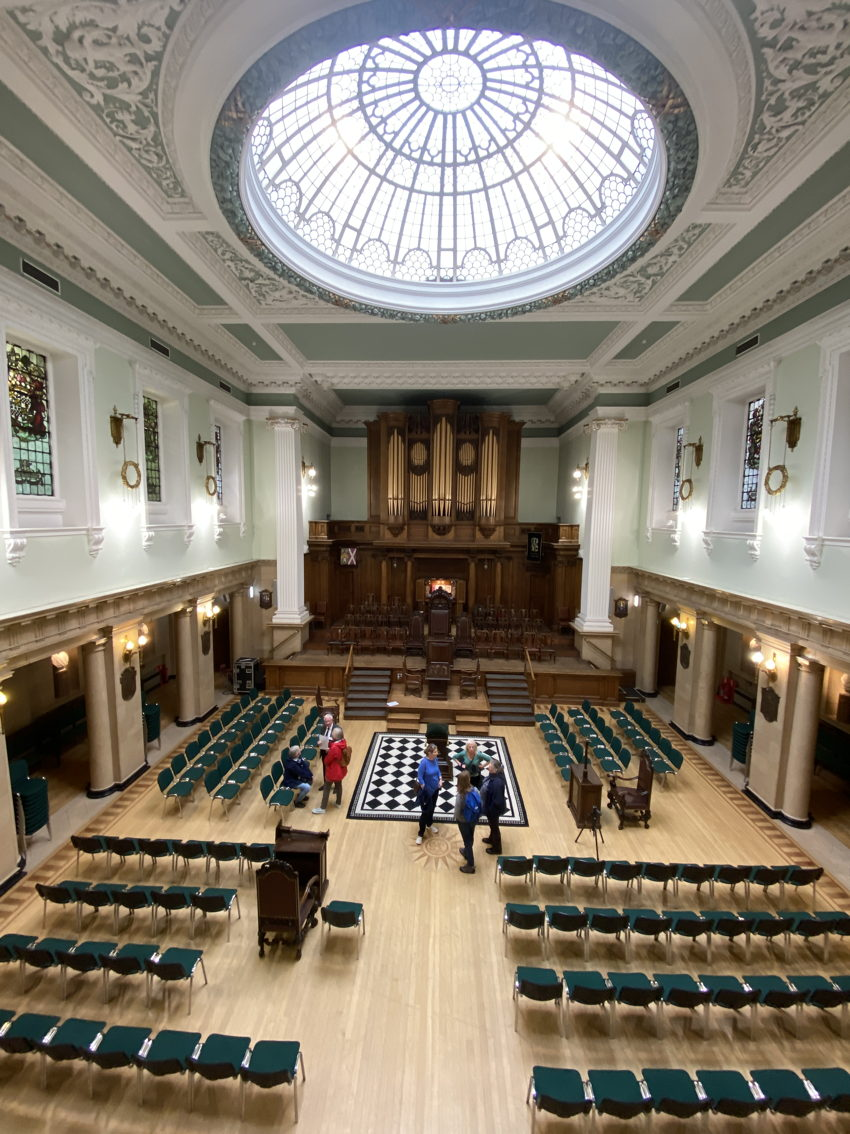
Freemasons' Hall at 96 George Street, Edinburgh

Freemasons' Hall in Edinburgh, Scotland, is the headquarters of Scottish Freemasonry, the Grand Lodge of Scotland. It is located at 96 George Street.

A Category A listed building, the hall was built during 1911–1912 and was designed by the Edinburgh architect Alexander Hunter Crawford. Crawford was himself a prominent freemason, and the hall is described as his most important work. The four-storey building also features a museum of masonic treasures and the facade features a large statue of St Andrew, by the sculptor Henry Snell Gamley. The building replaced a previous hall erected in 1858, designed by David Bryce.

== Concerts ==
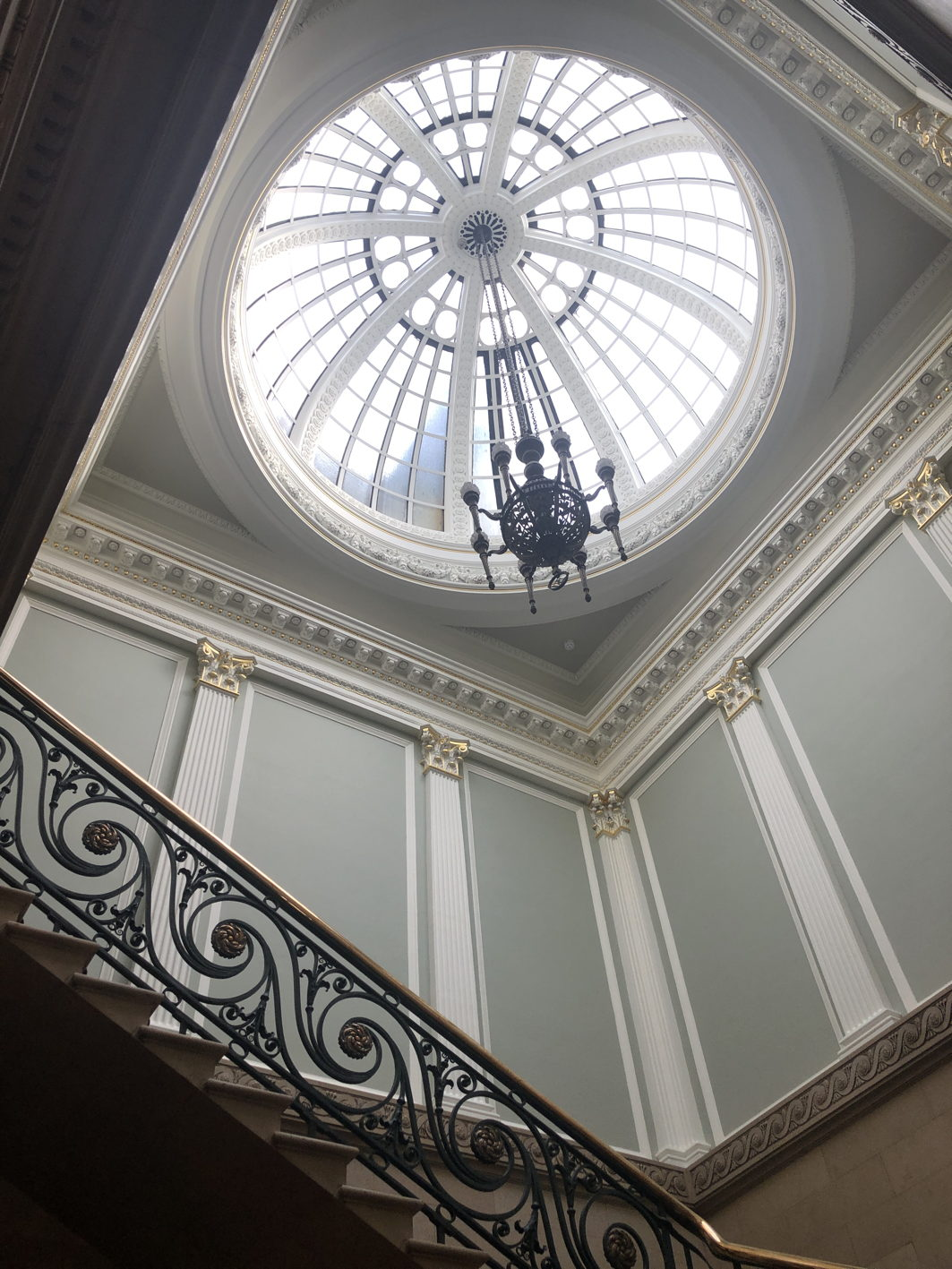
Stairwell and dome at Freemasons' Hall

In 1918, after the First World War, the Edinburgh Classical Concerts series resumed with a recital by Vladimir Rosing.

The hall was used for a series of 10 chamber concerts by Reginald Jacques and his Jacques Orchestra at the first Edinburgh International Festival in 1947. Soloists included Kathleen Ferrier, Peter Pears and Leon Goossens.

It became a regular festival venue in the first decades of the festival, and artists appearing in the hall included the celebrated instrumentalists Géza Anda, Martha Argerich, Pierre Boulez, Frans Brüggen, Dennis Brain, Adolf Busch, Clifford Curzon, Rudolf Firkušný, Pierre Fournier, Szymon Goldberg, Yehudi Menuhin, Gerald Moore, Itzhak Perlman, Jacqueline du Pré, Mstislav Rostropovich, Segovia, Rudolf Serkin, Ravi Shankar, Guilhermina Suggia, Isaac Stern, and Wolfgang Schneiderhan, and groups such as the Amadeus Quartet, Beaux Arts Trio, Juilliard Quartet, London Mozart Players. I Musici, and the Stuttgart Chamber Orchestra, led by Karl Münchinger.

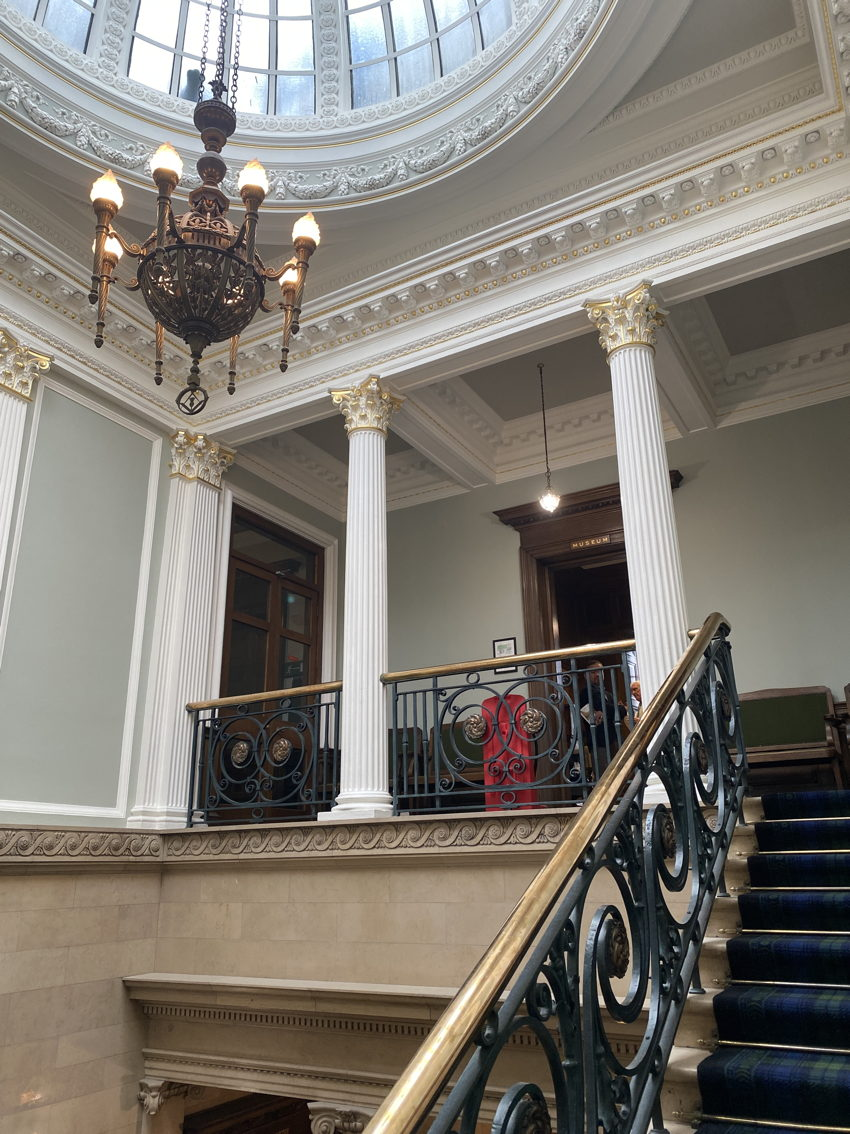
Staircase of the Freemasons' Hall, Edinburgh

Singers included Pierre Bernac, Mattiwilda Dobbs, Dietrich Fischer-Dieskau, Hans Hotter, Gerhard Hüsch, Victoria de los Ángeles, Julius Patzak, Peter Pears, Hermann Prey, Aksel Schiotz, Elisabeth Schwarzkopf, Irmgard Seefried, Gérard Souzay, Eleanor Steber, Shirley Verrett, and many others, together with the composer-accompanists Benjamin Britten and Francis Poulenc.

During the late 1960s and early 1970s, chamber music and recitals were increasingly shared with Leith Town Hall and St Cuthbert's Church, and by the end of the third decade of the festival major artists came less frequently to the Freemasons' Hall and it became more of a 'niche' venue for string quartets and small scale vocal ensembles.
