= Susan Edmonstone Ferrier =

Scottish novelist (1782–1854)

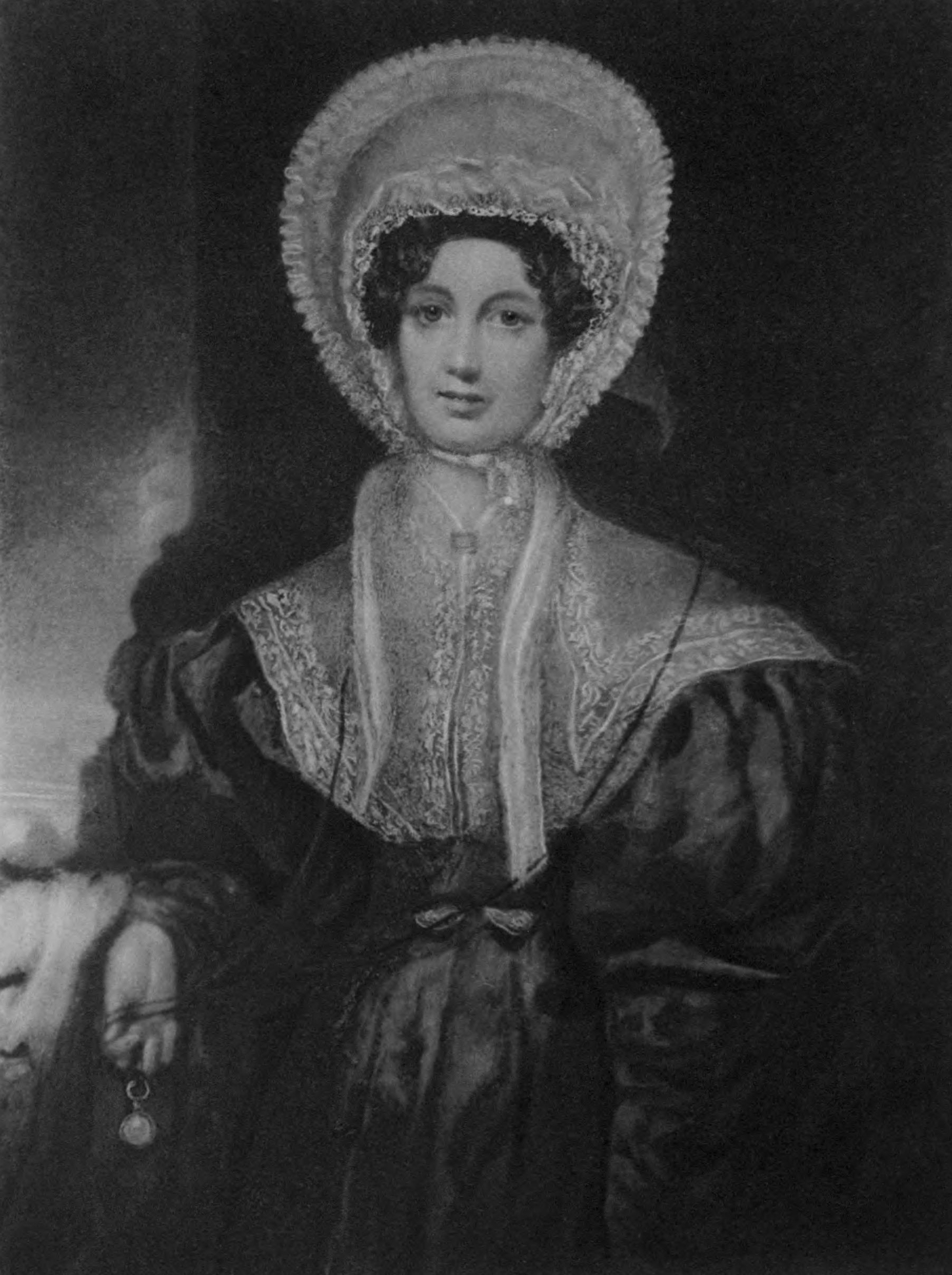
- Susan Ferrier from an engraving after the 1836 portrait by R. Thorburn
- Born: 7 September 1782; Edinburgh, Scotland
- Died: 5 November 1854 (aged 72); Edinburgh, Scotland
- Resting place: St Cuthbert's Churchyard, Edinburgh
- Occupation: novelist
- Writing career
- Notable works: Marriage; The Inheritance; Destiny

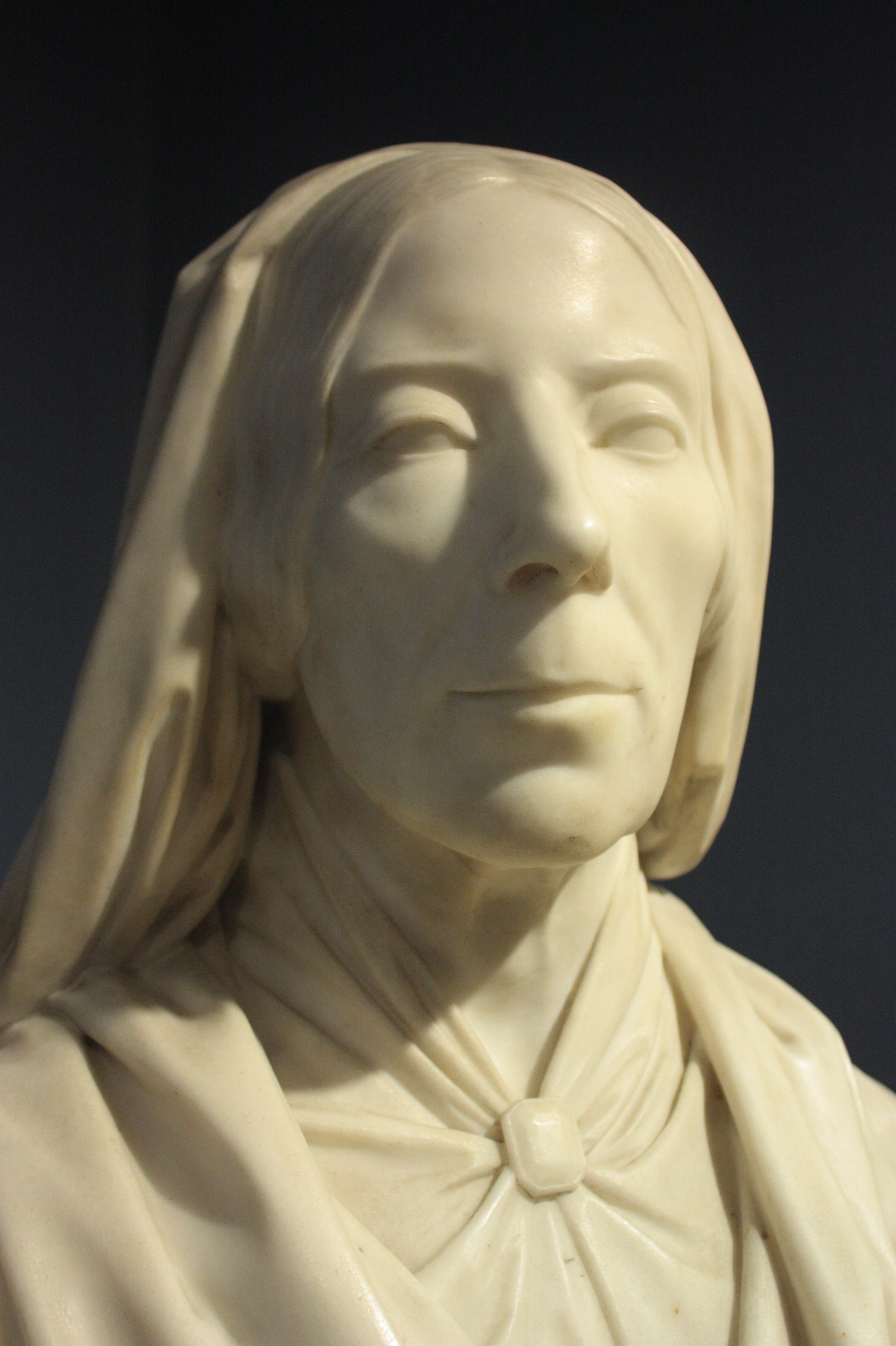
Susan Ferrier by John Gall, 1850

Susan Edmonstone Ferrier (7 September 1782 – 5 November 1854) was a Scottish novelist. Her novels, giving vivid accounts of Scottish life and presenting sharp views on women's education, remained popular throughout the 19th century.

== Life ==
Susan Ferrier was the youngest daughter of Helen Coutts (1741–1797) (daughter of Robert Coutts, a farmer near Montrose) and James Ferrier (1744–1829), Writer to the Signet and one of the principal clerks of the Court of Session, in which office he was a colleague of Sir Walter Scott. Her father came from Linlithgow. She was probably born at Lady Stair's Close, Edinburgh, as the ninth of ten surviving children. The family moved in 1784 to 11 (now 25) George Street in the New Town.

Ferrier was privately educated. Through her family she came to know many notable Edinburgh people, including Scott and the novelist Henry Mackenzie. In 1797 her father took her to Inveraray, home of his client and patron John Campbell, 5th Duke of Argyll. She became a friend of the family, especially of a granddaughter, Charlotte Clavering (died 1869), with whom she corresponded. Clavering was initially involved in the writing of Ferrier's first novel Marriage, although ultimately her contribution was limited to the section entitled "The History of Mrs Douglas". Some letters between Ferrier and Clavering appear in the front matter of a six-volume edition of the novels.

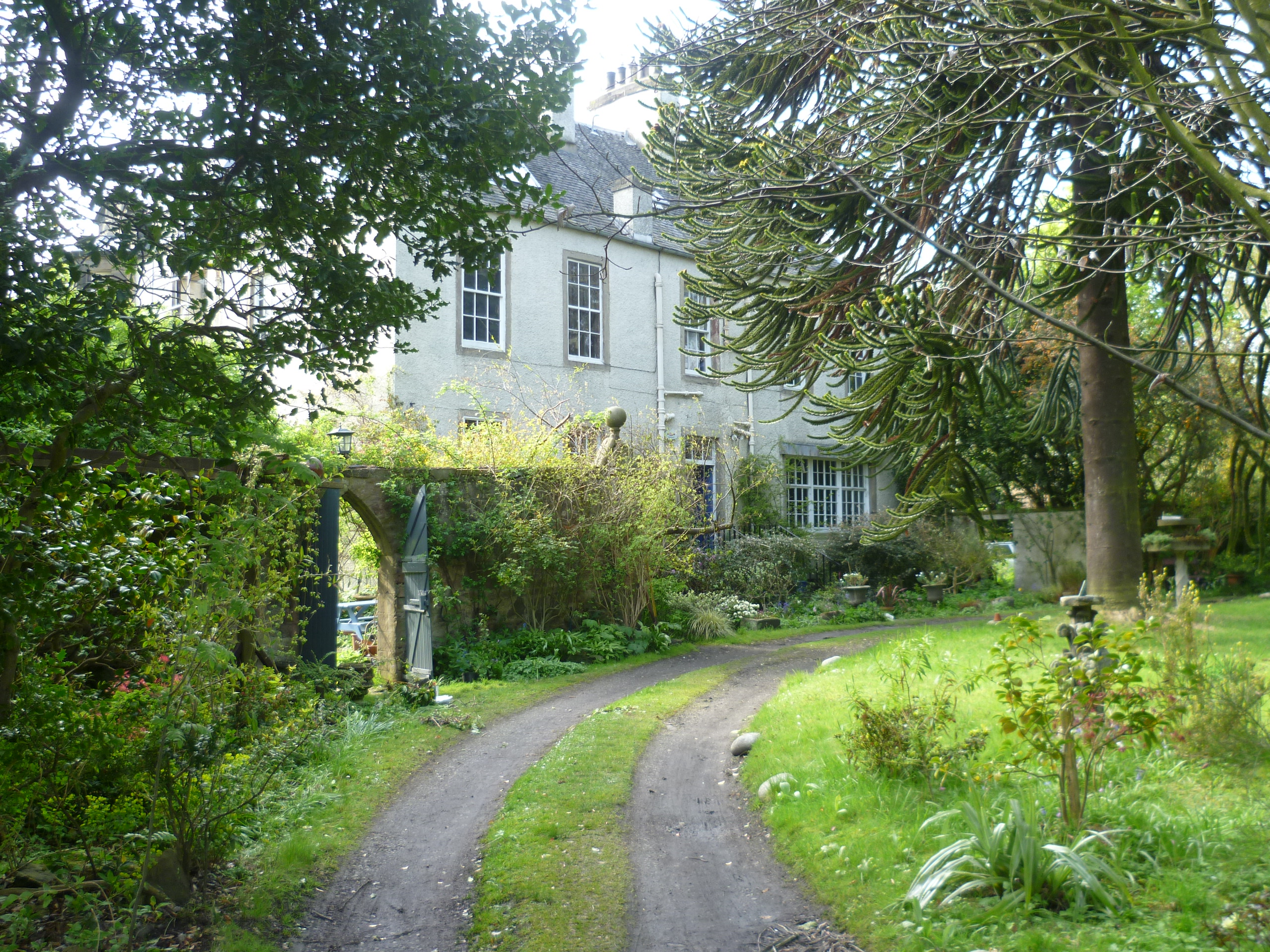
East Morningside House

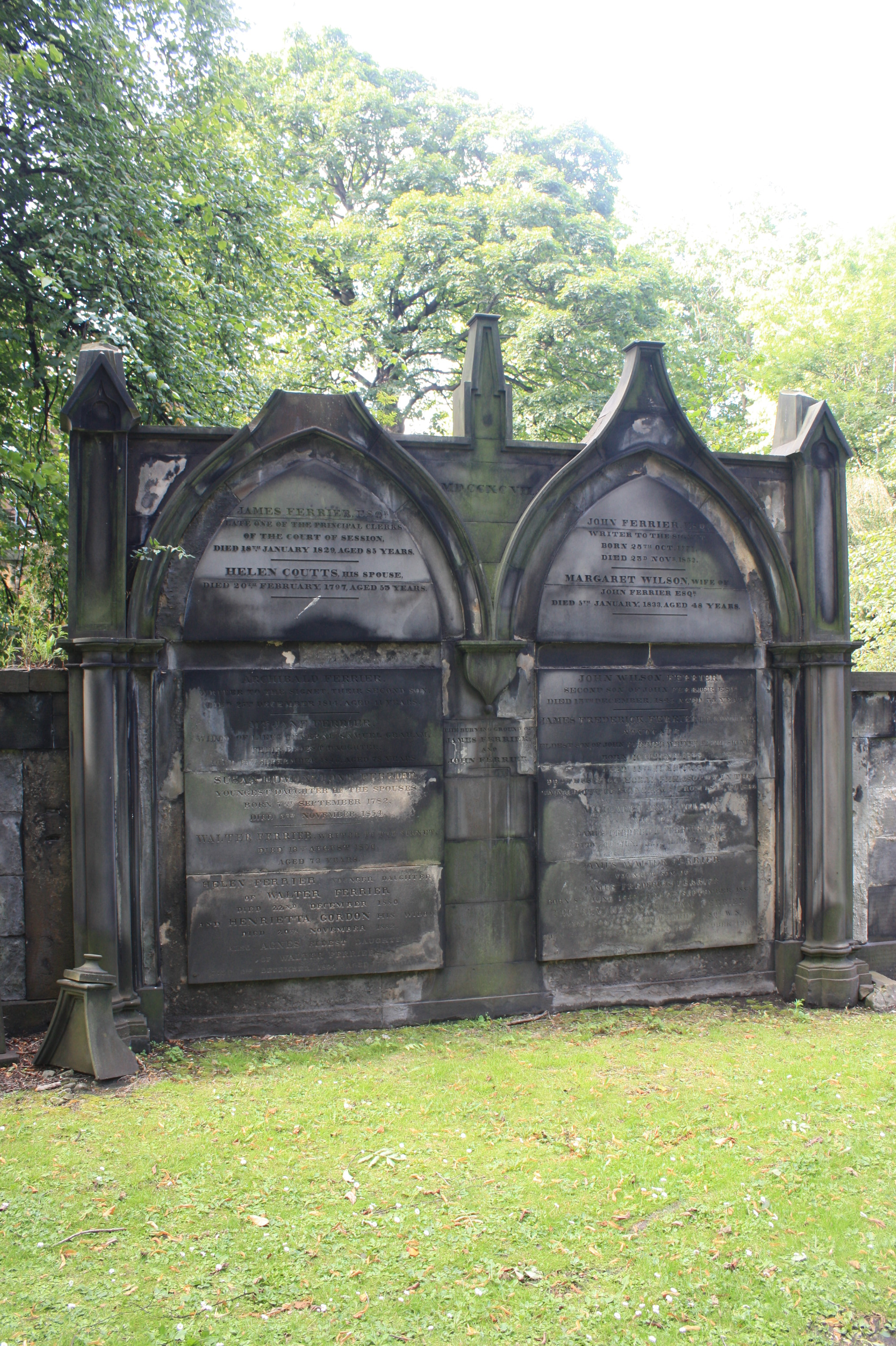
The grave of Susan Ferrier, St Cuthberts Churchyard, Edinburgh

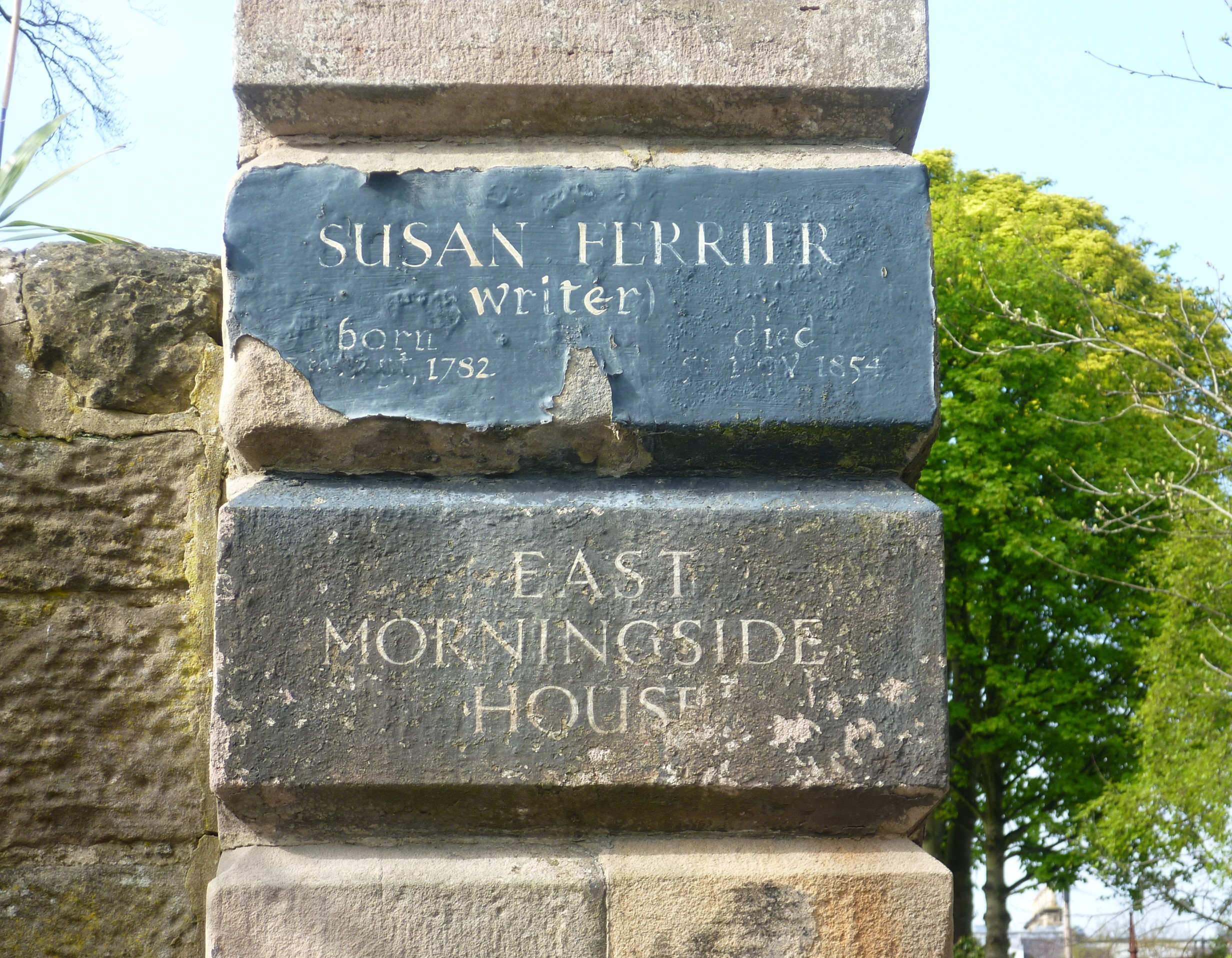
Gatepost sign

After her mother died, Ferrier kept house for her father, as her three older sisters were married. Like many well-to-do Edinburgh families, they took a house outside the city in the summer, East Morningside House. While there she wrote The Inheritance. She still wished her work to appear anonymously, but her identity was widely known by then.

In 1811 Ferrier visited Scott at Ashiestiel Farm and House on the banks of the River Tweed, near Clovenfords in the Scottish Borders, and again in 1829 and 1831 at his new residence, Abbotsford House. They enjoyed each other's company and he wrote of her: "This gifted personage besides having great talents has conversation the least exigeant of any author, female at least..., simple, full of humour, and exceedingly ready at repartee, and all this without the least affectation of the blue stocking." He mentioned her in the same sentence as Maria Edgeworth and Frances Burney in 1825. Ferrier's account of the visits eventually appeared posthumously in the magazine Temple Bar (1874).

Ferrier's own tastes in literature appear in her letters. She admired Jane Austen and Scott (though she had reservations about some works of his), but scorned John Galt and John Gibson Lockhart. The last of several visits to London was paid in 1830 to see an oculist, when she stayed at the villa of Lord Casilis in Isleworth, the model for a house known as Woodlands in Destiny.

Brought up in the Church of Scotland, Ferrier joined the Free Church after the Disruption of 1843. Her eye troubles contributed to making her reclusive in her old age. She died on 5 November 1854 at her brother's house, 38 Albany Street, Edinburgh, and was buried with her family in St Cuthbert's Churchyard. The grave lies on a main dividing wall immediately north of the church.

Ferrier's eldest brother married the sister of John Wilson, who wrote under the pseudonym Christopher North.

== The novels ==
Ferrier wrote three novels. Marriage was written in 1810 but much revised. It was published anonymously in 1818 by the Edinburgh firm of William Blackwood, which paid £150 for it. Its success was remarkable. A French translation appeared in 1825.

In 1824 Blackwood was prepared to pay £1000 for the second novel, The Inheritance, which according to 20th-century scholars, "mixes sententious moralizing with detailed, wry, caustic observation of the 'thrice-told tale' of factors which make unions happy or unhappy." The third novel, Destiny, was dedicated to Sir Walter Scott, who found that Robert Cadell of Edinburgh was willing to pay £1700 in 1831.

In 1841 Ferrier sold the copyrights to the three novels to Richard Bentley, who reissued them in an illustrated edition with authorial revisions. In 1851 this edition was reprinted, with Ferrier's name included for the first time as the author. The library edition of 1881 and 1882 included a Memoir.

A book-length memoir and correspondence appeared in 1898. Modern critical appraisals have been sparse, however in 1982 the National Library of Scotland produced a full catalogue of her works and life for an exhibition.

Her novels combine humour with vivid accounts of Scottish social life and sharp views on marriage and female education. They retained their popularity through the 19th century. In the 20th their popularity began to wane, although editions of Marriage have appeared sporadically since the Second World War.

According to an early 20th-century history of literature, "In the novels of Susan Edmonstone Ferrier there is something of the rough sarcasm of Smollett, mingled with a strong didactic flavour and with occasional displays of sentiment that may be due to Mackenzie. To her personal friend Scott, she may have owed something in her studies of Scottish life, but Maria Edgeworth was her principal model." The book criticizes her works for loose plotting and "coarse workmanship", but praises her vigour and calls it "fresh and interesting".

It has been argued recently that the three novels form a trilogy – an extended inquiry on the subjects of nation, history, and the evolution of female consciousness.

== Legacy ==
In December 2017, the Scottish author Val McDermid commented in The Observer that she hoped to revive the memory of Ferrier as Scotland's "Jane Austen".

== See also ==
- James Frederick Ferrier, her nephew.
