= George Street, Edinburgh =

Street in Edinburgh, Scotland

Coordinates: 55.9529°N 3.2004°W

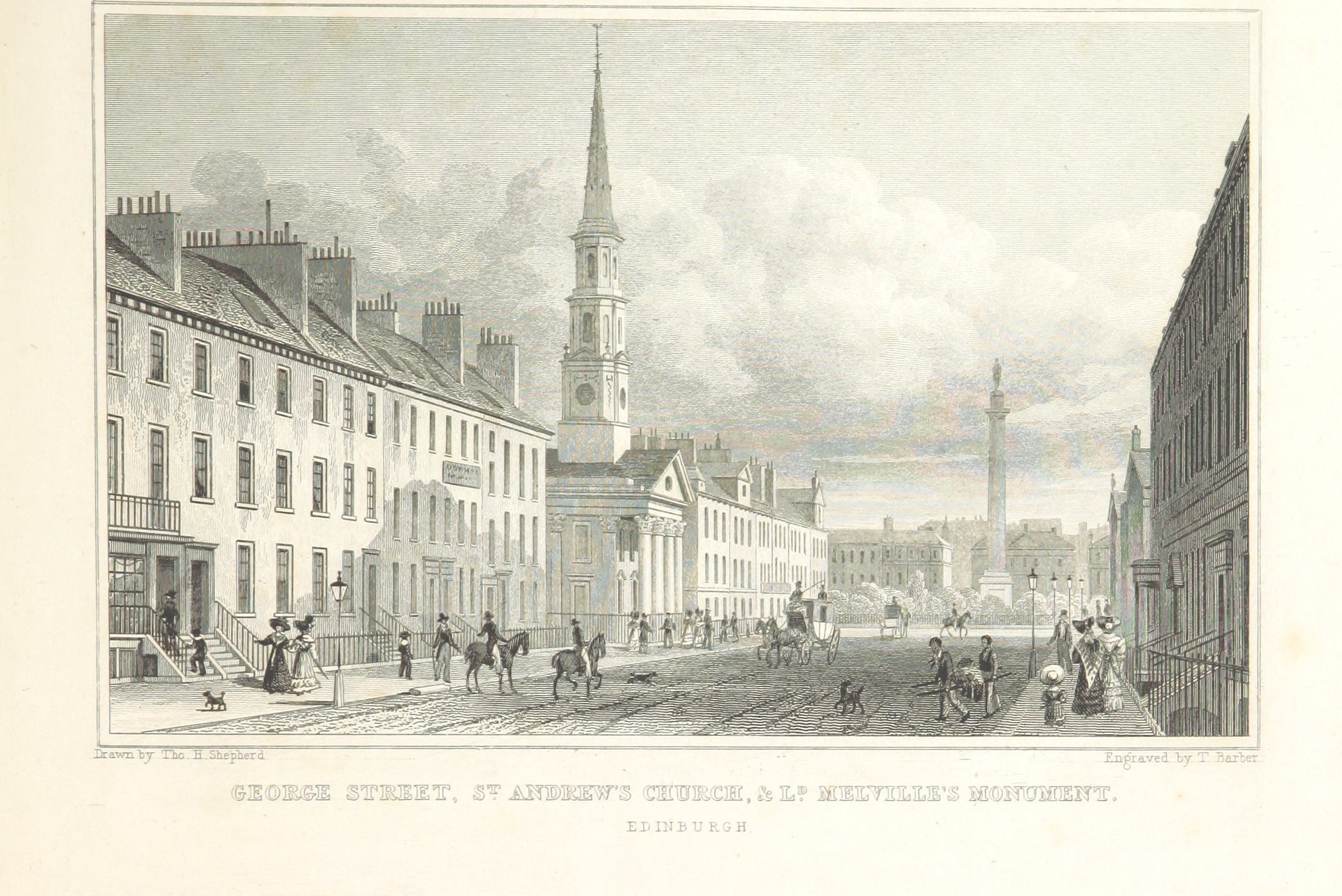
The east end of George Street with St Andrew's Church, and Lord Melville's Monument, c. 1829

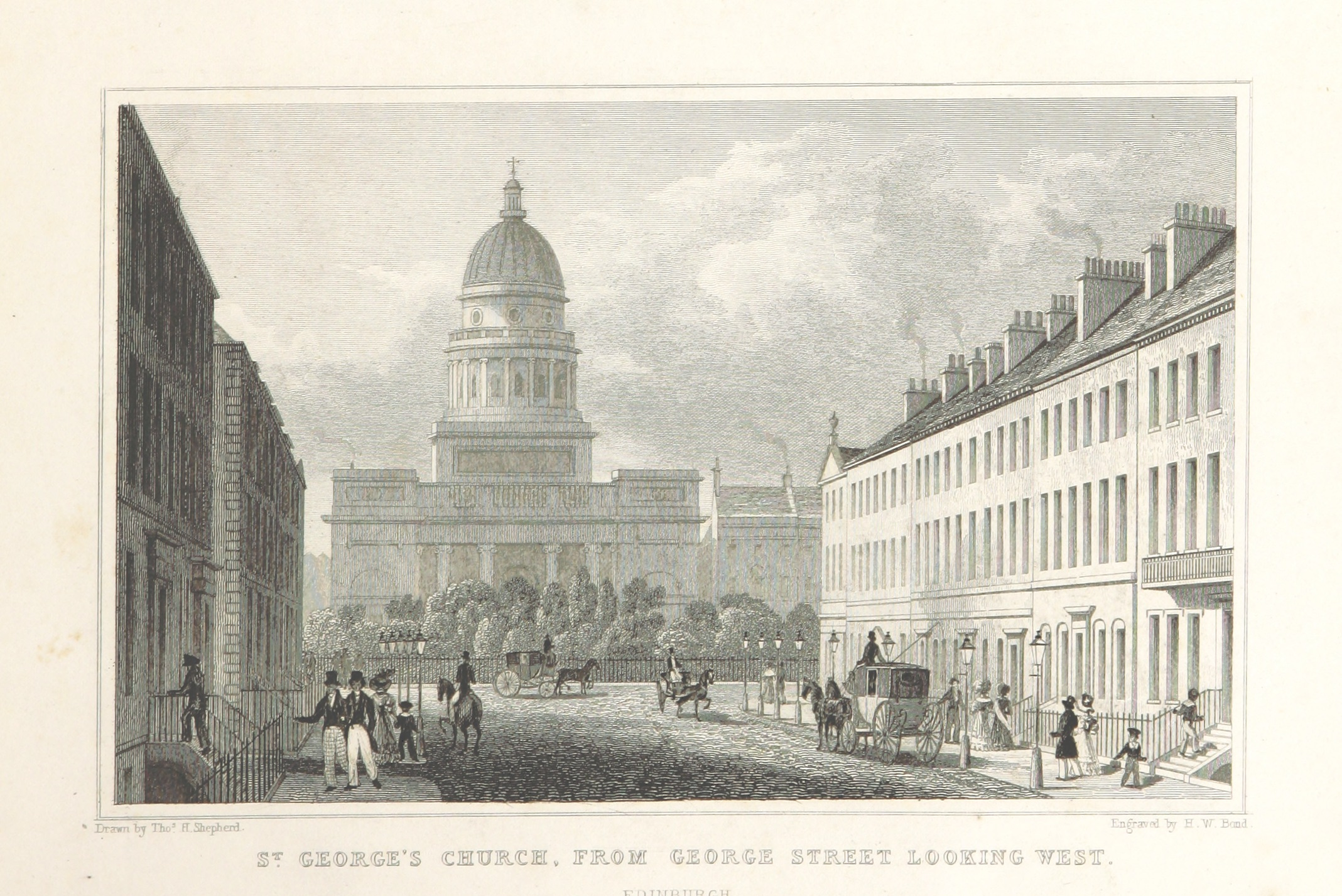
The west end of George Street, looking towards Charlotte Square and St George's Church, c. 1829

George Street is the central thoroughfare of the First New Town of Edinburgh, planned in the 18th century by James Craig.

The street takes its name from King George III and connects St Andrew Square in the east with Charlotte Square in the west. It is located on the north side of the Old Town of Edinburgh, to the north of the Princes Street and to the south of Queen Street, running straight along the high point of a ridge.

George Street, as first proposed in 1767 and initially built, was a residential area. However in the Victorian period the houses were replaced by shops, showrooms, banks, small department stores and hotels. A number of the grander of these buildings were designed by the prominent Victorian architect David Bryce, who lived in the street.

George Street in the 21st century remains essentially a Victorian townscape, but the use of many of the commercial buildings has changed to restaurants, coffee shops and bars, with many high quality clothes shops.

== Notable buildings, listed by address ==
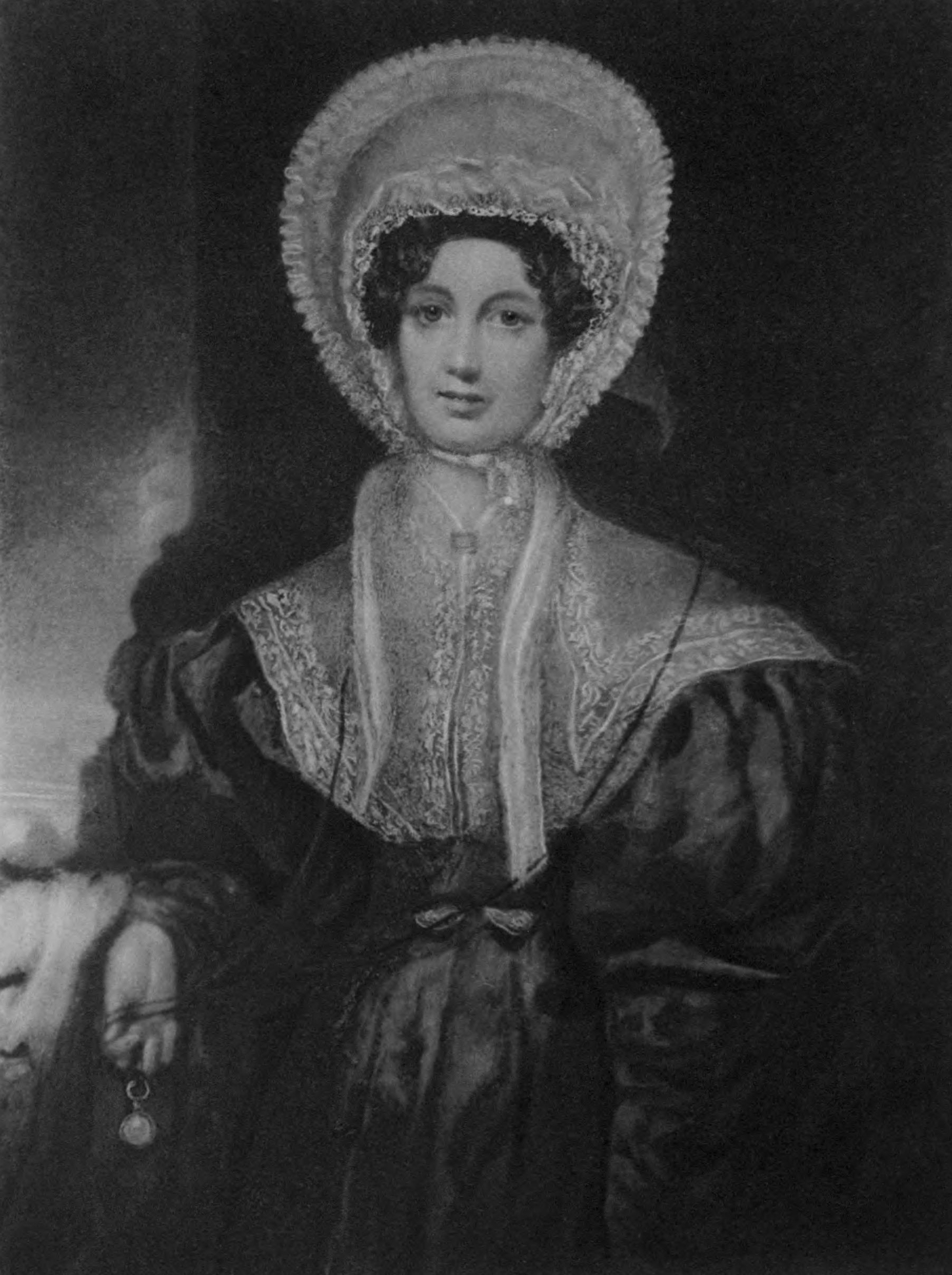
The novelist Susan Ferrier lived at 25, George Street, c.1784-1830

=== North side ===
- 13 - St Andrew's and St George's West Church (formerly St Andrew's Church), which dates from 1784.
- 15-17-19 - Caledonian Insurance Company designed by David Bryce in 1839-1840. Rebuilt in 1879-1880 when number 19 became part of the George Hotel.
- 19-21 - The George Hotel, now renamed the Principal, established in 1881, combining Bryce's building and five townhouses dating back to 1775.
- 25 - home of the novelist Susan Ferrier from 1784 to circa 1830.
- 65 - formerly Dowells Auctioneers, built in 1907-1908 using pale pink Dumfriesshire sandstone, designed by John Nichol Scott and Alexander Lorne Campbell.
- 71 - location of the US Consulate from 1915 to 1950.
- 81 - home of the murderer Eugene Chantrelle.
- 89 - Renaissance-style five-storey shop, built in 1902, designed by Harry Ramsay Taylor. Formerly Gray's of Edinburgh hardware shop from 1903 to its closure in 2010, .
- 95, 95A - formerly the Insurance Company of Scotland, designed by David Bryce in 1840
- 101-103 - former Bank of Scotland branch, built in 1882-1883, designed by J M Dick Peddie
- 117-121 - Headquarters of the Church of Scotland, built 1909-11, designed by Sydney Mitchell & Wilson. The central offices of the Church of Scotland are often colloquially known within the denomination as "one-two-one".
- 131 - former residence of the architect David Bryce, rebuilt by him in 1883.

=== South side ===
- 14 - The Dome, originally designed by David Rhind and built in 1847 as the headquarters of the Commercial Bank of Scotland. This is on the site of James Craig's Physicians' Hall, built for the Royal College of Physicians of Edinburgh in 1781 and demolished c. 1843.
- 22-24-26 - The Royal Society of Edinburgh, occupying a building that was formerly owned by the Edinburgh Life Assurance Company.
- 44 - Trotters Opticians, restored to a 'period' appearance in 1985.
- 54 - Assembly Rooms, which opened in 1787.
- 62-64-66 - former Union Bank of Scotland, designed by David Bryce in 1876.
- 78-80 - formerly the Professional and Civil Service Supply Association department store, built by John James Burnet 1903-1907.
- 96 - Freemasons' Hall, the headquarters of Scottish Freemasonry, built 1911–1912.
- 100-104 - early modern movement steel-framed building designed by Alfred George Lochhead, erected in 1924–1925 for Cleghorn's Department Store, B-listed.
- 120 — B-listed building with traditional façade, headquarters of TSB Bank.
- 130 - formerly the studio of the artist Mabel Dawson.

== Statues ==
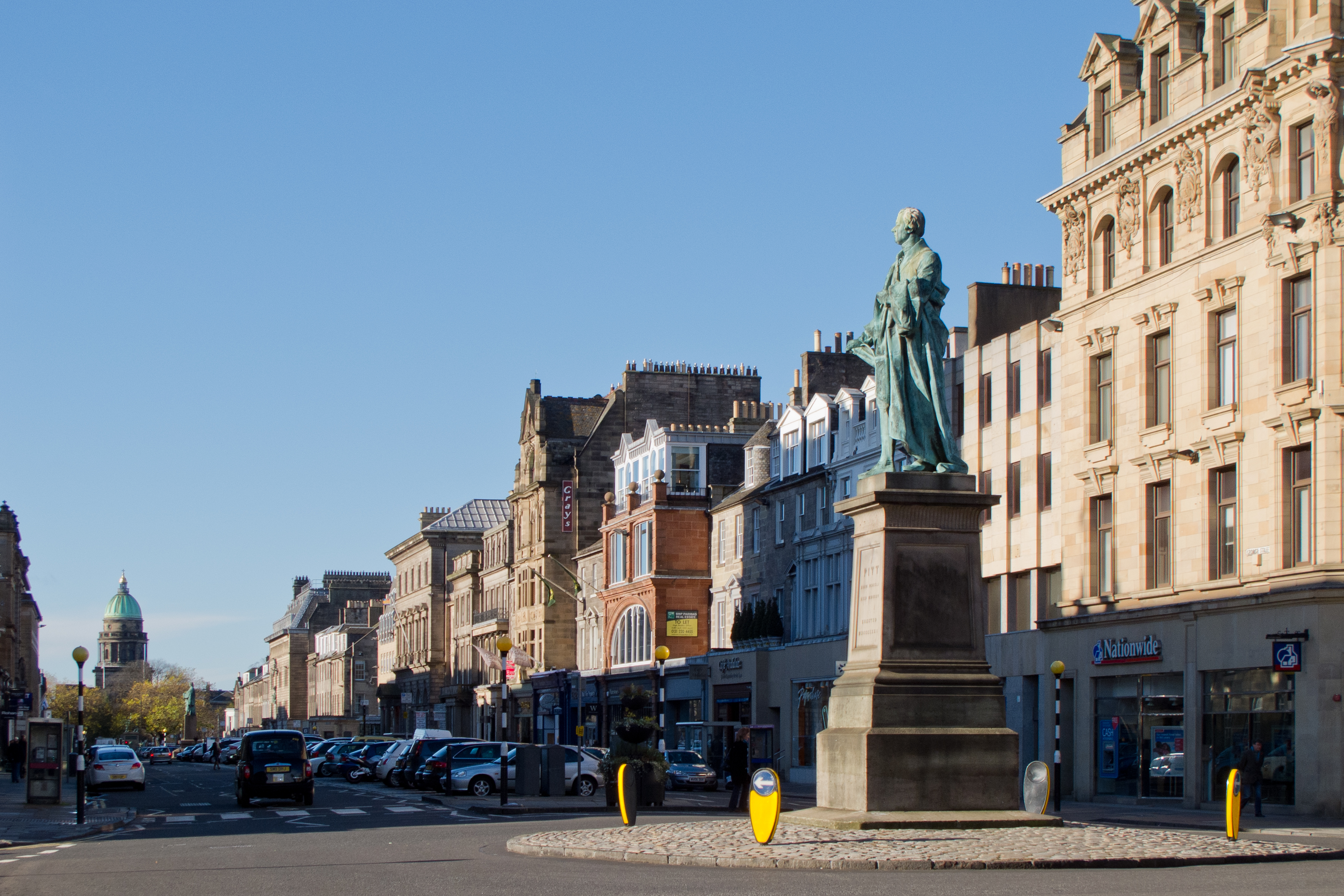
View looking west from the statue of William Pitt.

Statues are located at vantage points along the street, depicting the prominent churchman Thomas Chalmers (1780–1847, erected in 1878, at the intersection with Castle Street), the British prime minister William Pitt the Younger (1759–1806, statue from 1831-3, at the intersection with Frederick Street), King George IV (1762–1830, reigned 1820–1830, statue made to commemorate his visit to Scotland in 1822, at the intersection with Hanover Street), and the Scottish scientist James Clerk Maxwell (1831–1879, statue dating from 2008, at the eastern end of George Street, near St Andrew Square).

== Recent history ==
During construction work for the Edinburgh Trams project in 2011 and 2012, George Street became an important diversionary route as the parallel Princes Street was closed to traffic; a survey in April 2012, during the works, found that footfall on the street was one-third higher than during the same month in 2011, while footfall in Princes Street had declined. By 2013 it had become, according to the Edinburgh Evening News, "the city’s most prestigious shopping district".

In October 2012, the City of Edinburgh Council approved a 12-month trial starting in June 2014 that saw George Street featuring a one way system for vehicles, and a dedicated two way bike lane. As part of this the outdoor space for restaurants and bars on this street was extended, too. On street car parking was being reviewed, and the frequency of buses on Princes street was reduced significantly. The trial used an Experimental Traffic Regulation Order (ETRO) as a place making and design measure. At the end of a trial the street was returned to its previous layout before the long-term plan was put to the public. Ironside Farrer conducted a consultation and proposed a "continental style" solution in their report. This report was discussed by the council on 7 June 2016 and the design principles approved unanimously. The council agreed that a more detailed design was to be drawn up by February 2017 covering issues around traffic flow, transport users, the built streetscape including the statues, and pedestrians.

== Future plans ==
A new City of Edinburgh project for a 'George Street and First New Town Redesign' was launched in 2018, with a series of consultations and drop-in events during 2018 and 2019. The aim of the redesign is "to create a vibrant area with a world class street environment that is safe for all users. It will enhance its use for pedestrians while prioritising active travel for all."

In 2021, new proposals were unveiled that would see the street mostly pedestrianised.

== During the Edinburgh Festival ==
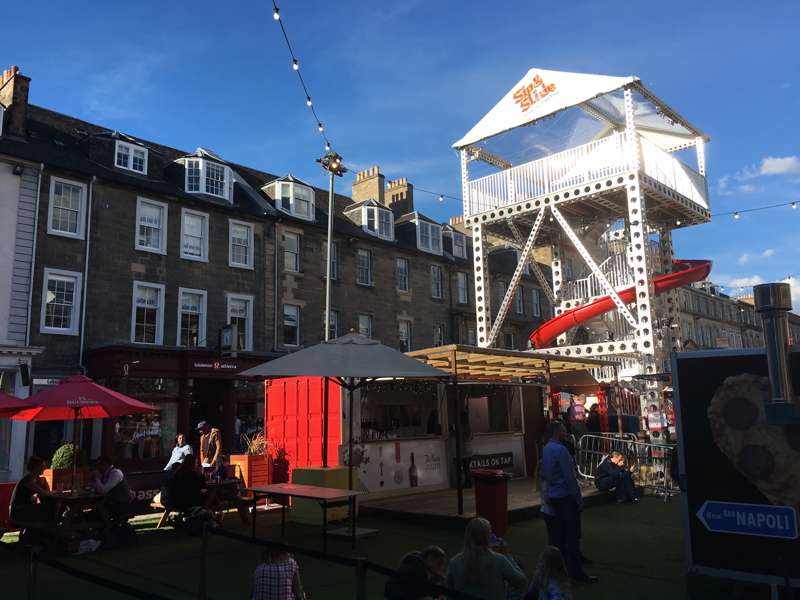
George Street during the Edinburgh Festival in August 2018

In 2013 the street became a focal point for the Edinburgh Festival, with pedestrian areas increased and traffic space reduced.

During the August 2016 festival period a new event, WestFest, took place on the most westerly block of George Street, which was closed to traffic between Castle Street and Charlotte Square. The event featured a whisky experience, a mobile cinema and 9-hole mini golf as well as a temporary cafe and bar. Most of the George Street restaurants had extra outdoor seating during the event.

== Gallery ==
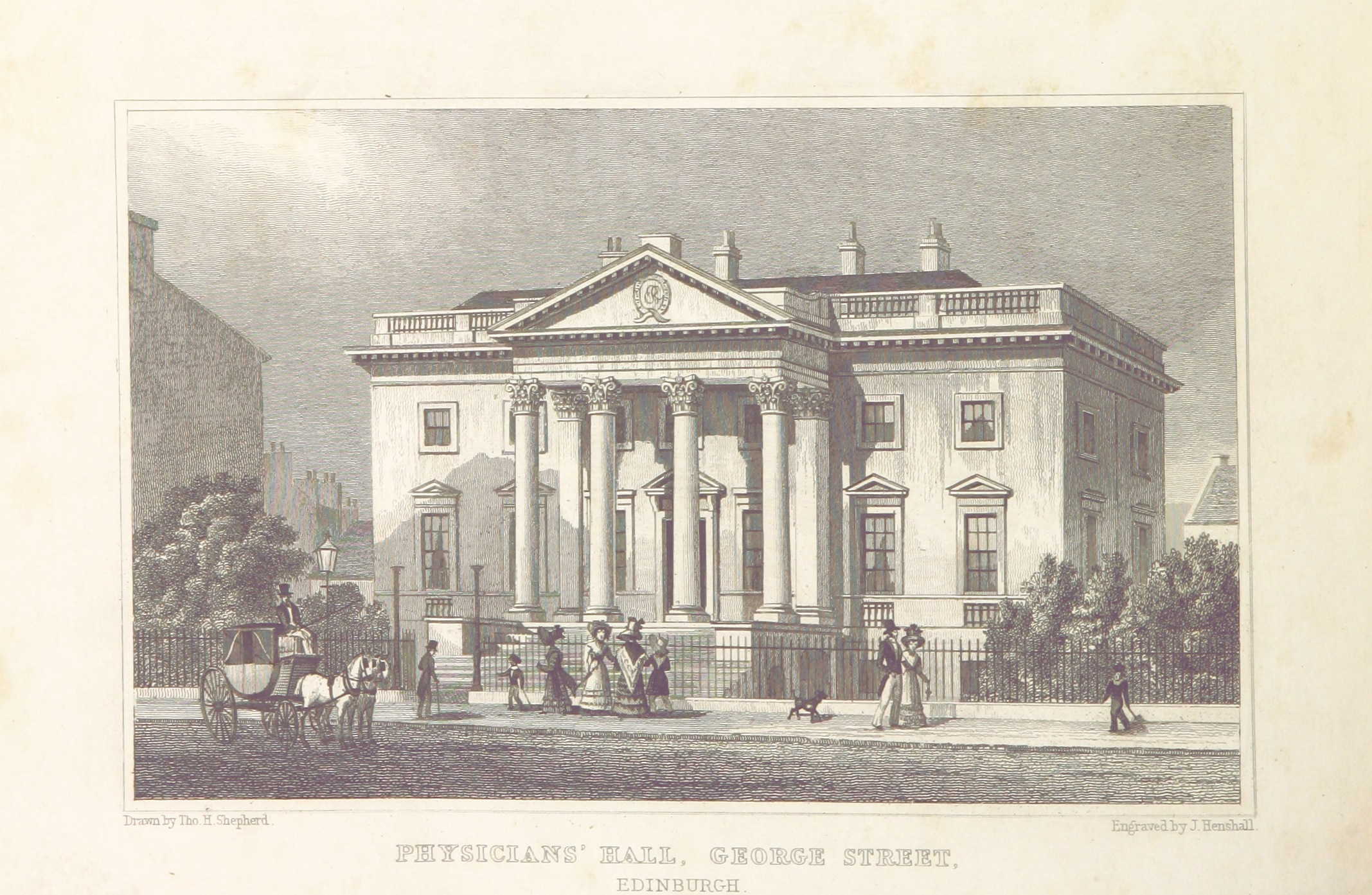
Physicians' Hall, George Street, circa 1829

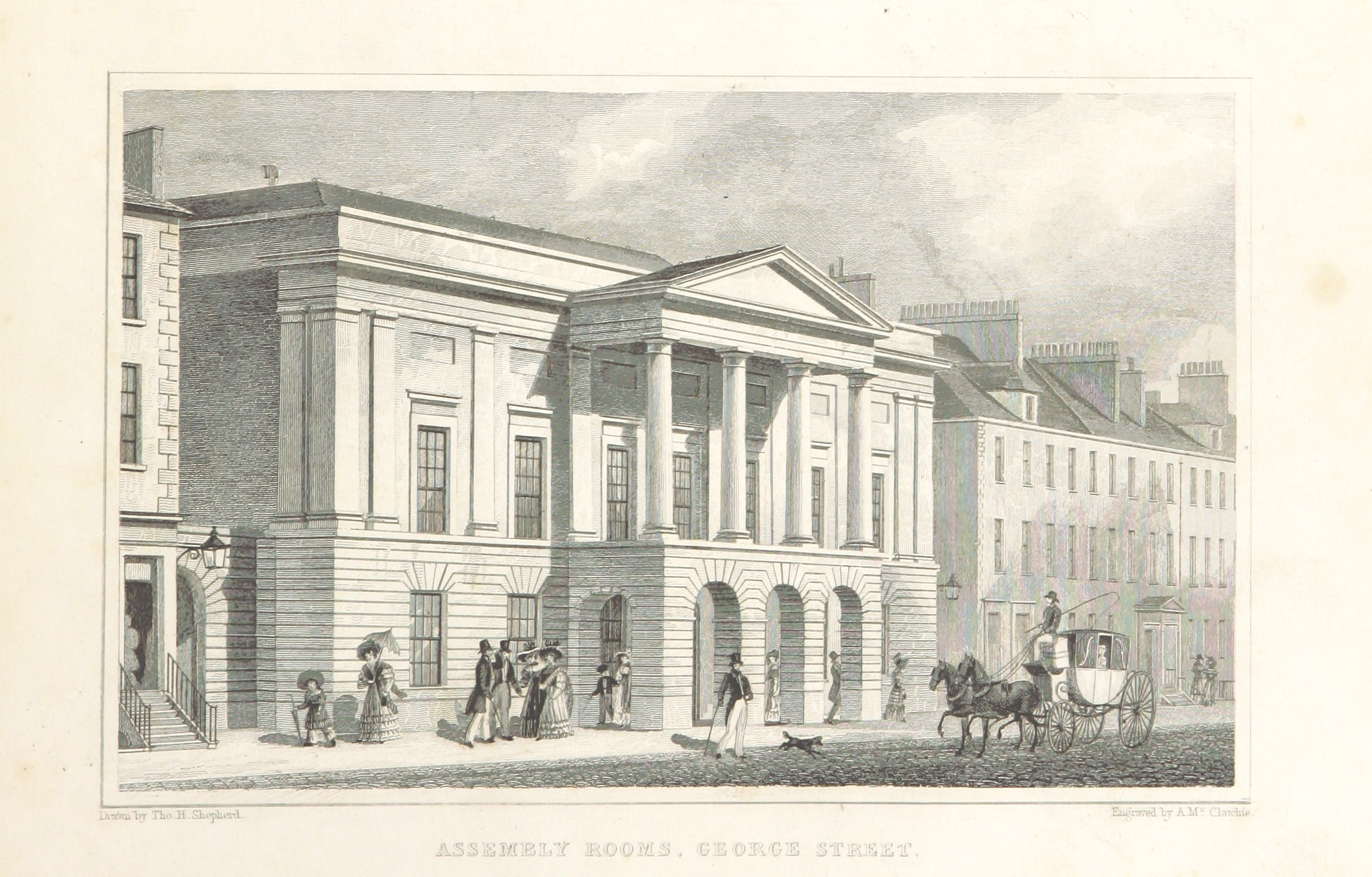
Assembly Rooms, George Street, circa 1829

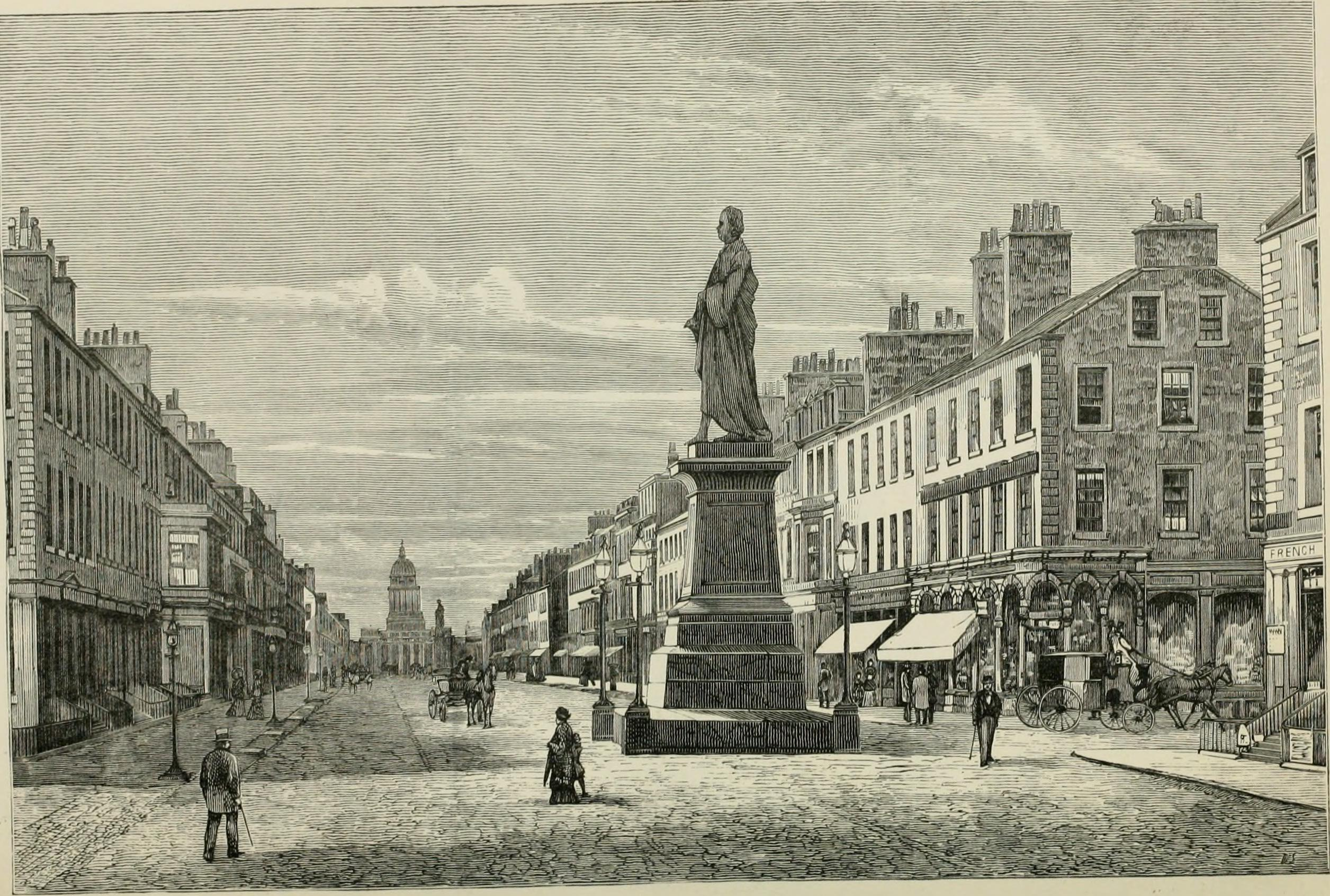
George Street in 1881

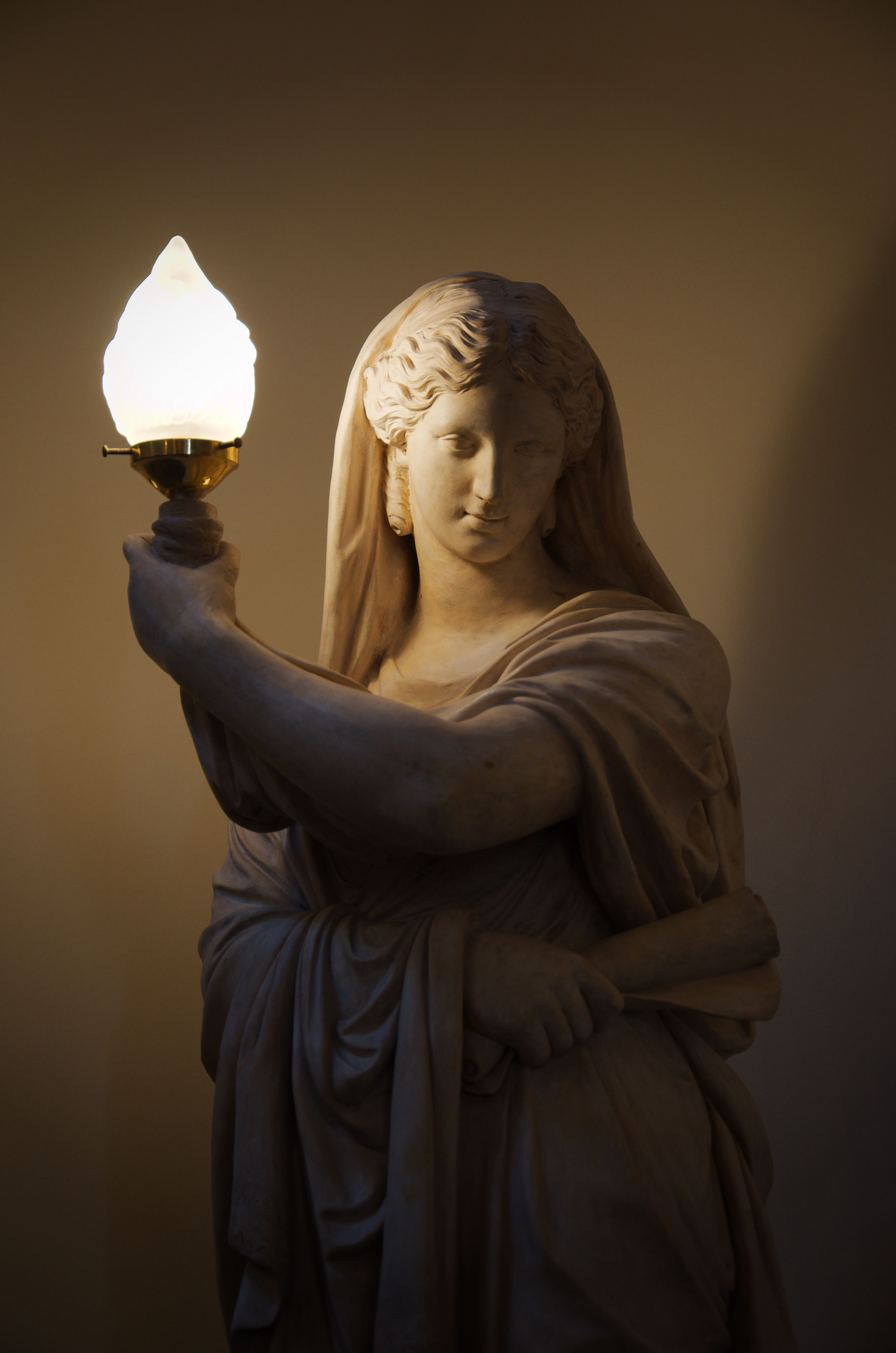
Statue in the Assembly Rooms

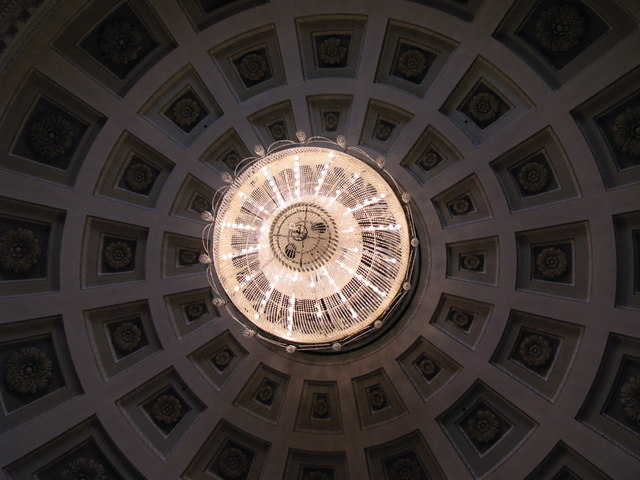
Chandelier in the Assembly Rooms, George Street

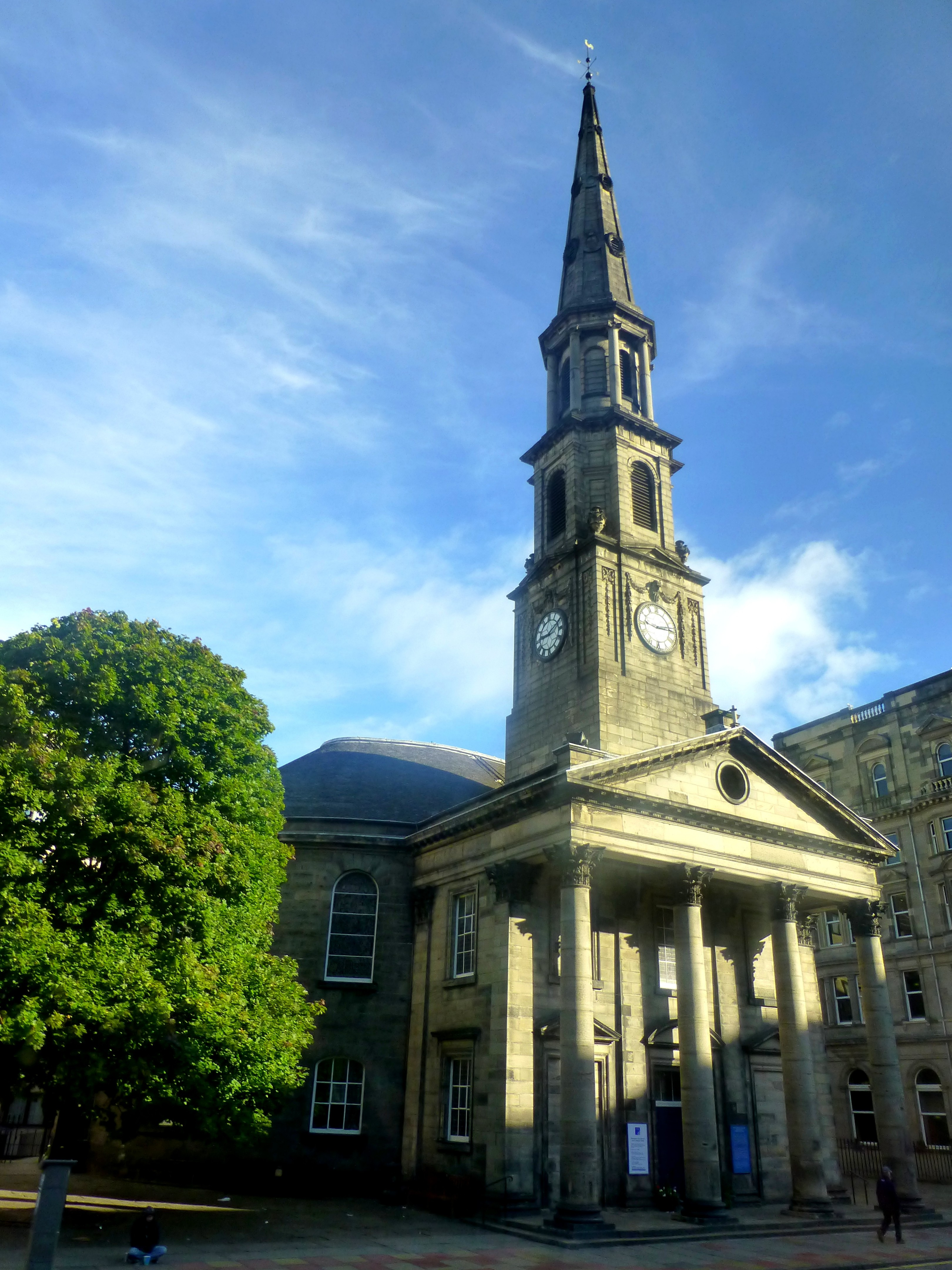
Edinburgh - St Andrew & St George Church

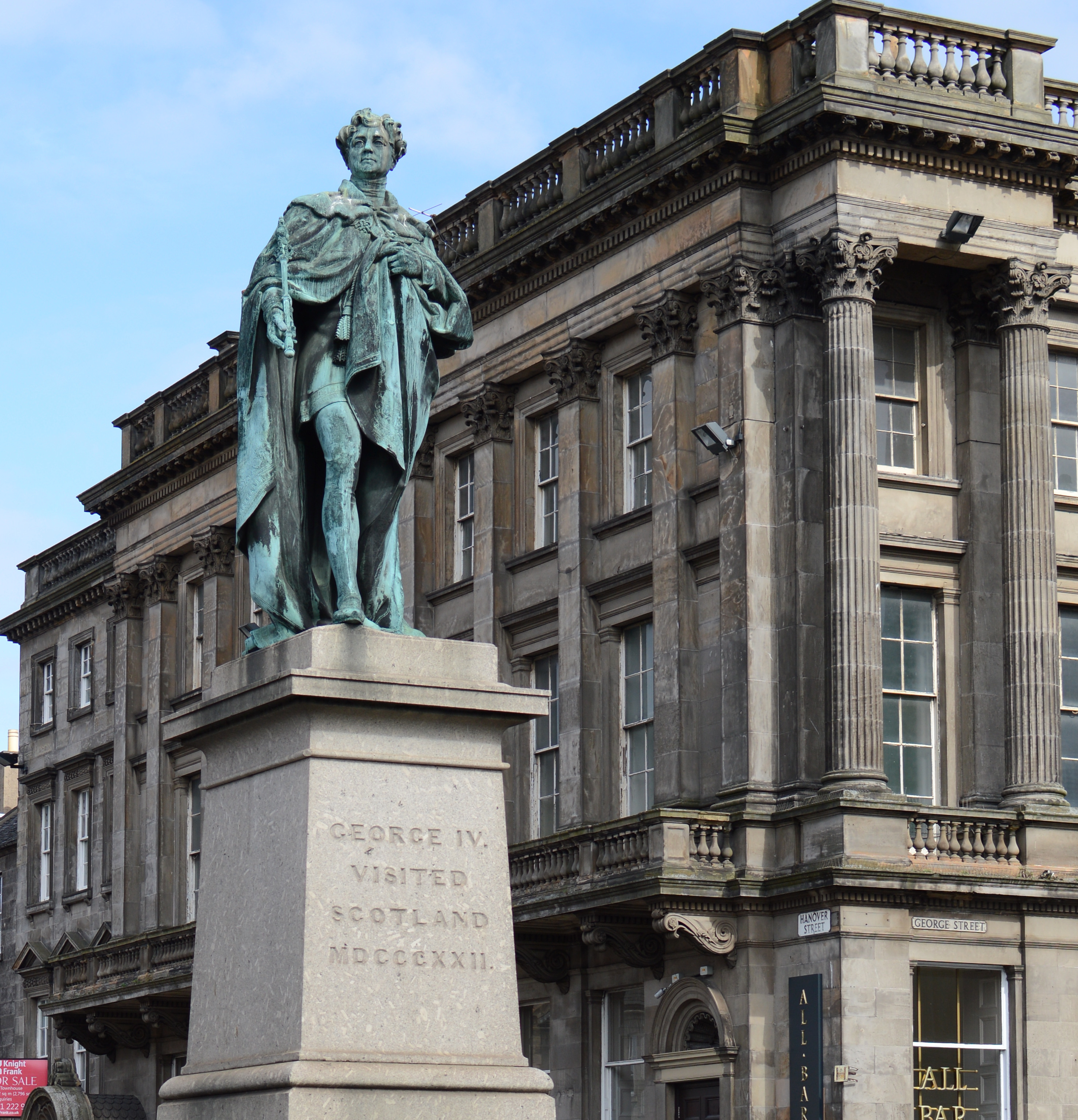
Statue of George IV at the intersection of George Street and Hanover Street

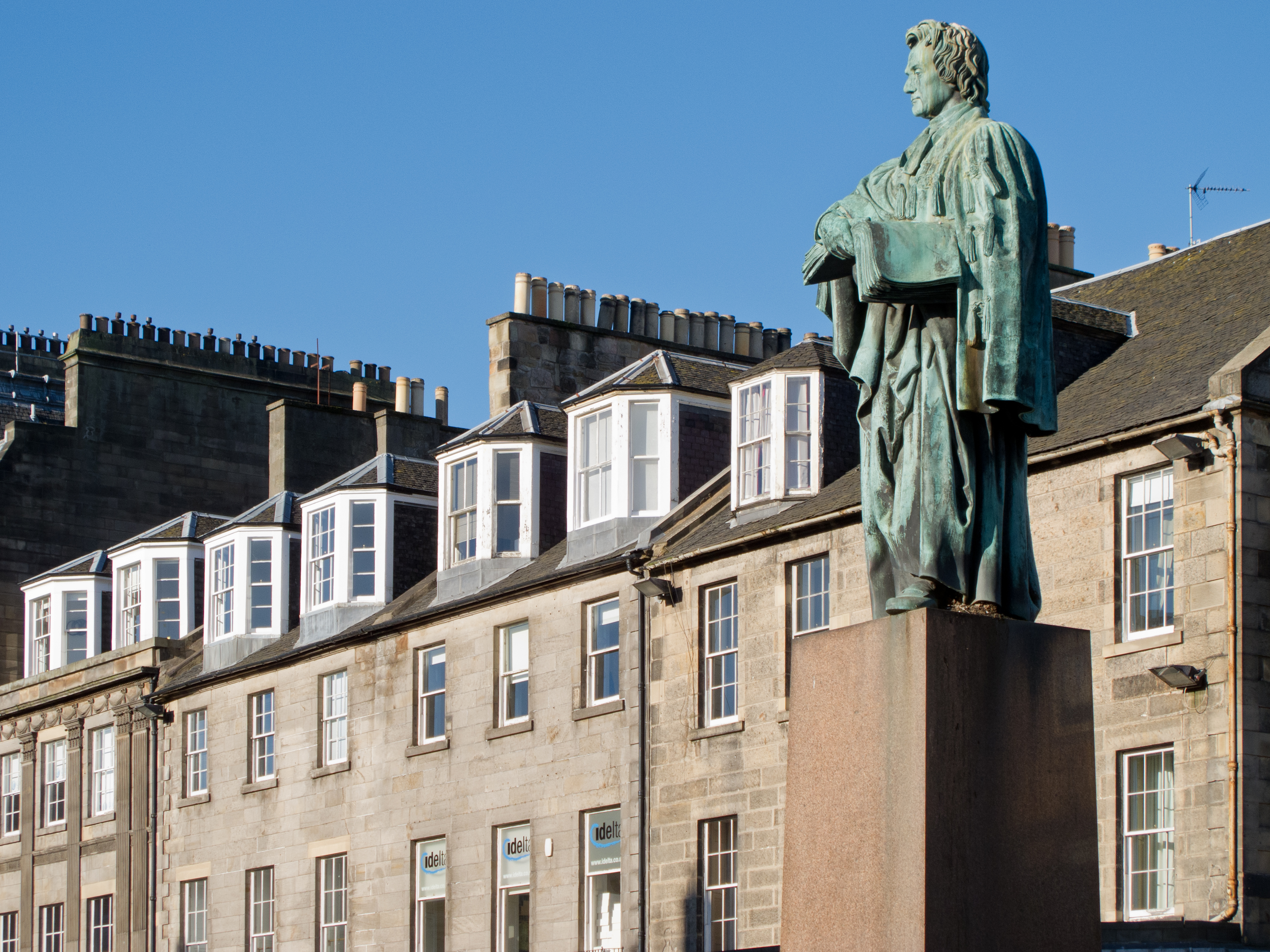
Statue of Thomas Chalmers, at the intersection of George Street and Castle Street

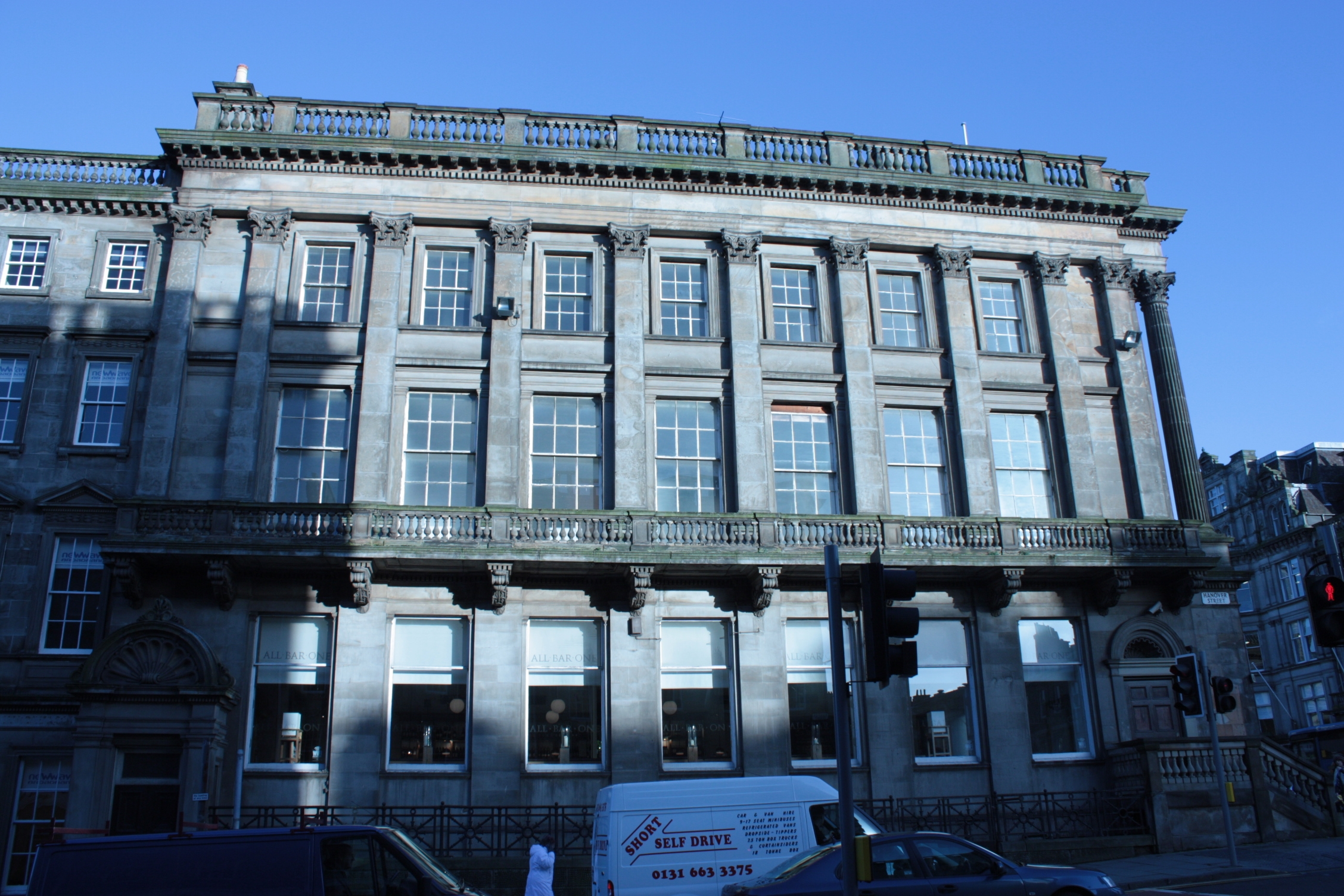
David Bryce's bank building, on the corner of Hanover Street and George Street

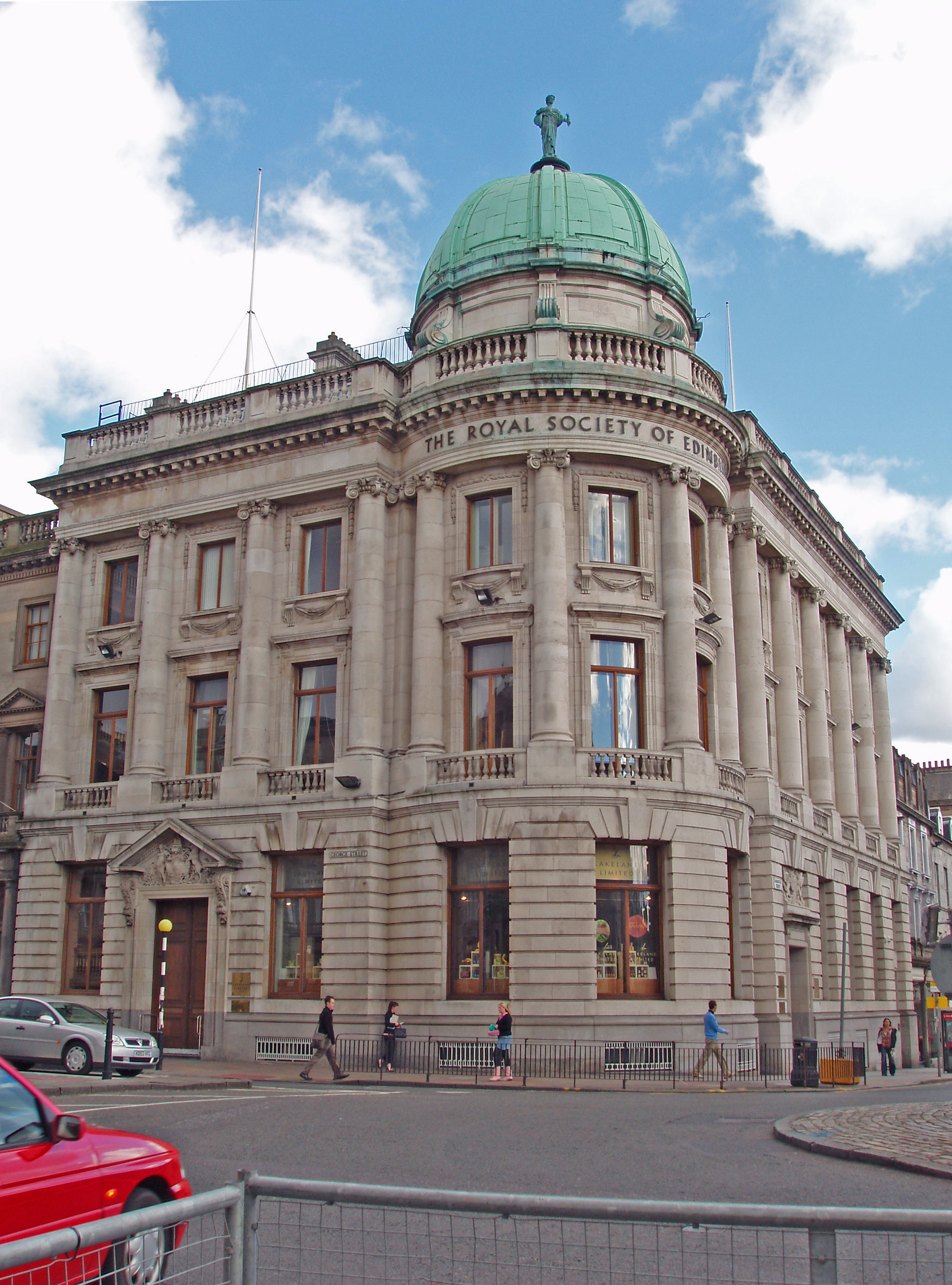
The Royal Society

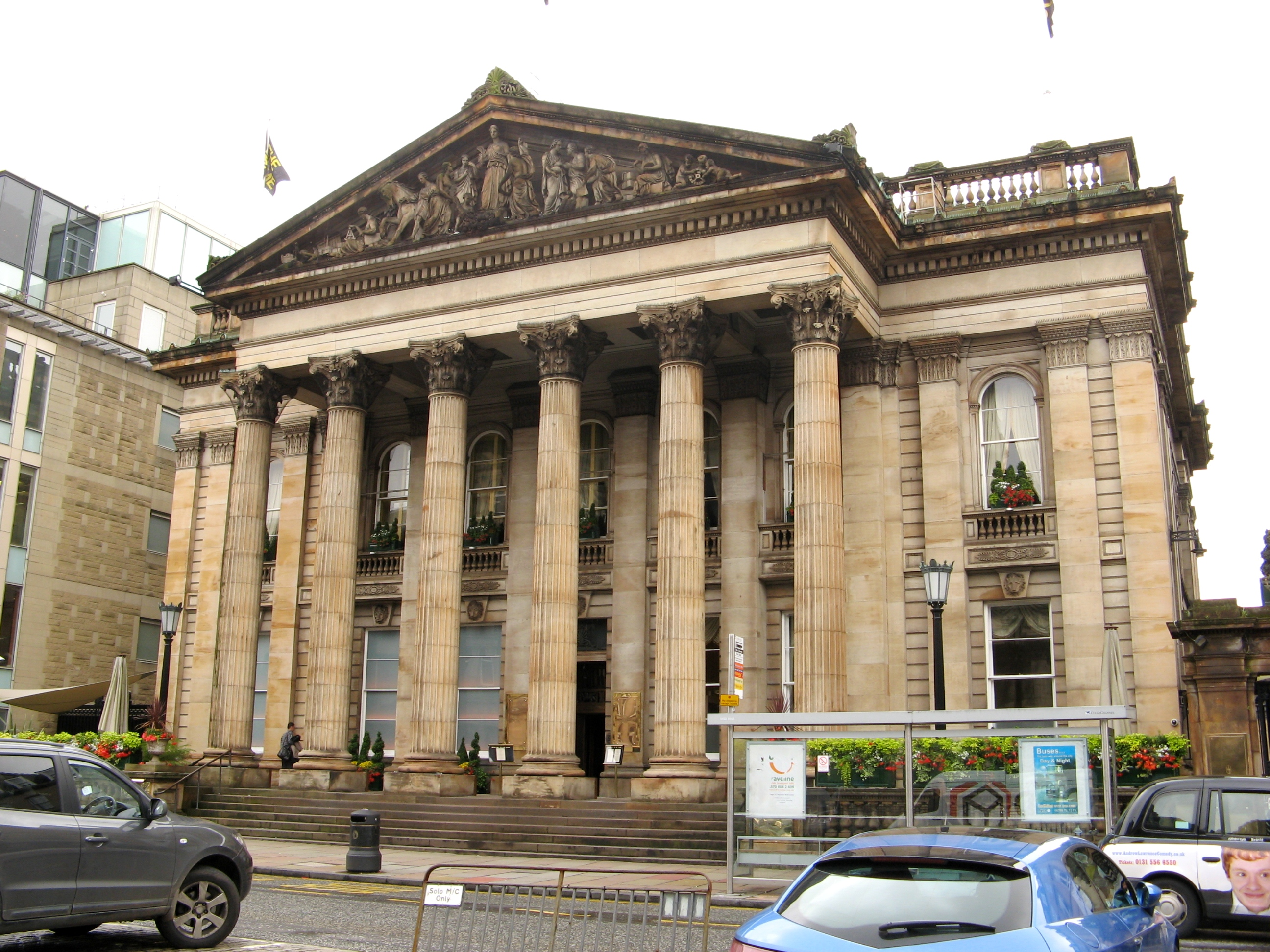
The Dome, formerly the Commercial Bank of Scotland

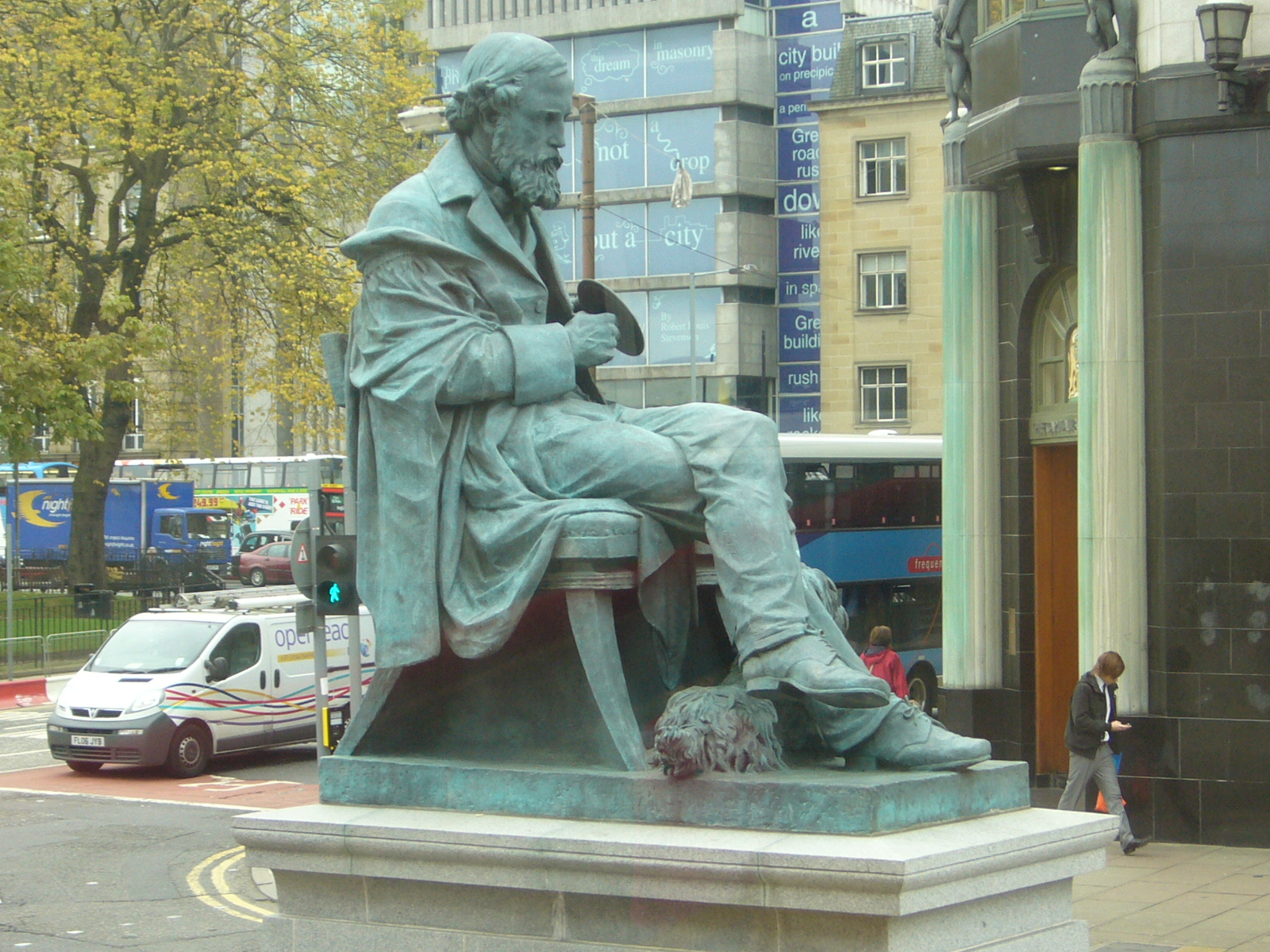
Statue of James Clerk Maxwell by Alexander Stoddart dating from 2008, at the east end of George Street.

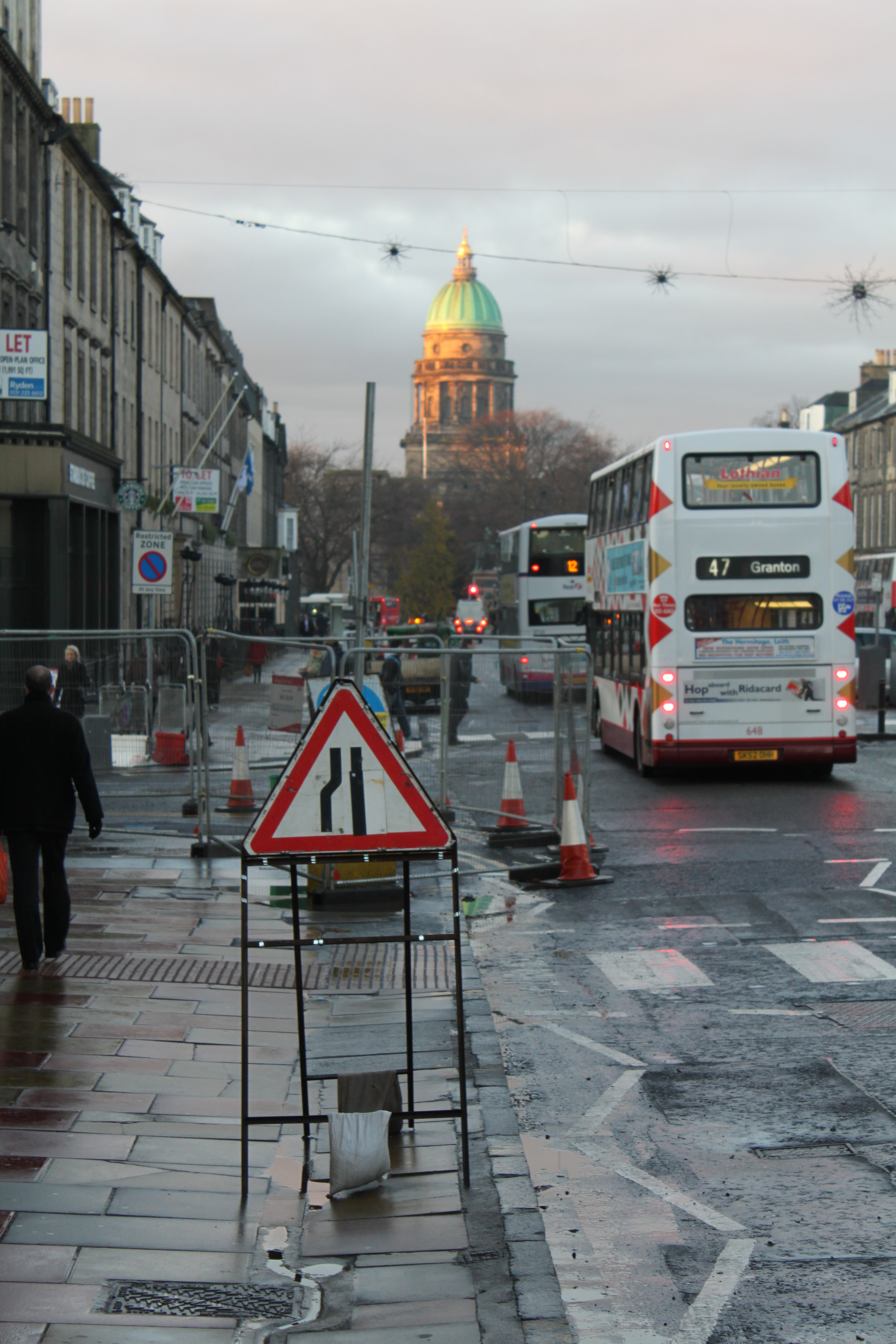
George Street, Edinburgh, December 2009

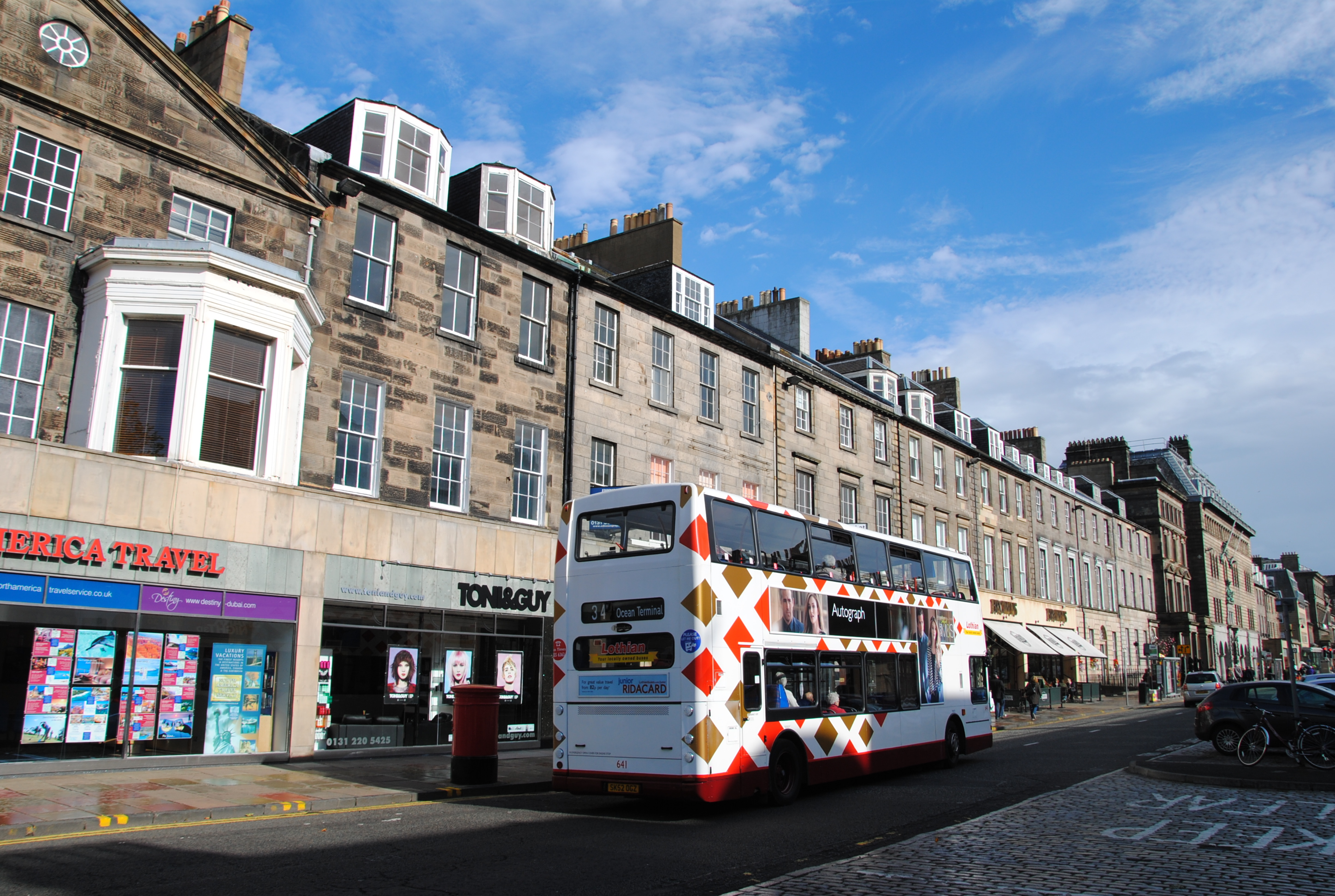
George Street in 2011, with London-style shop fronts on historic buildings

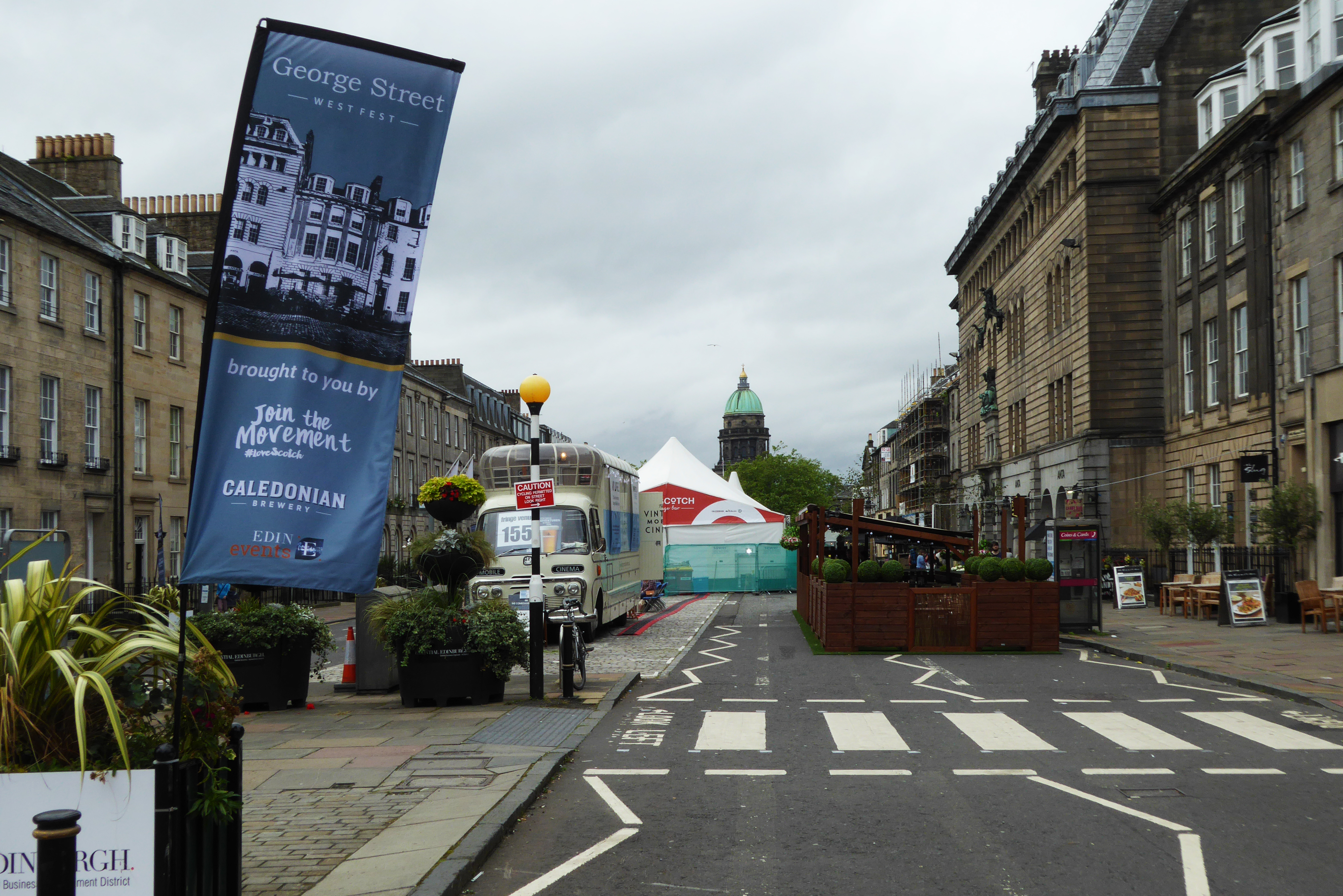
George St, Edinburgh, closed to traffic during the WestFest trial.

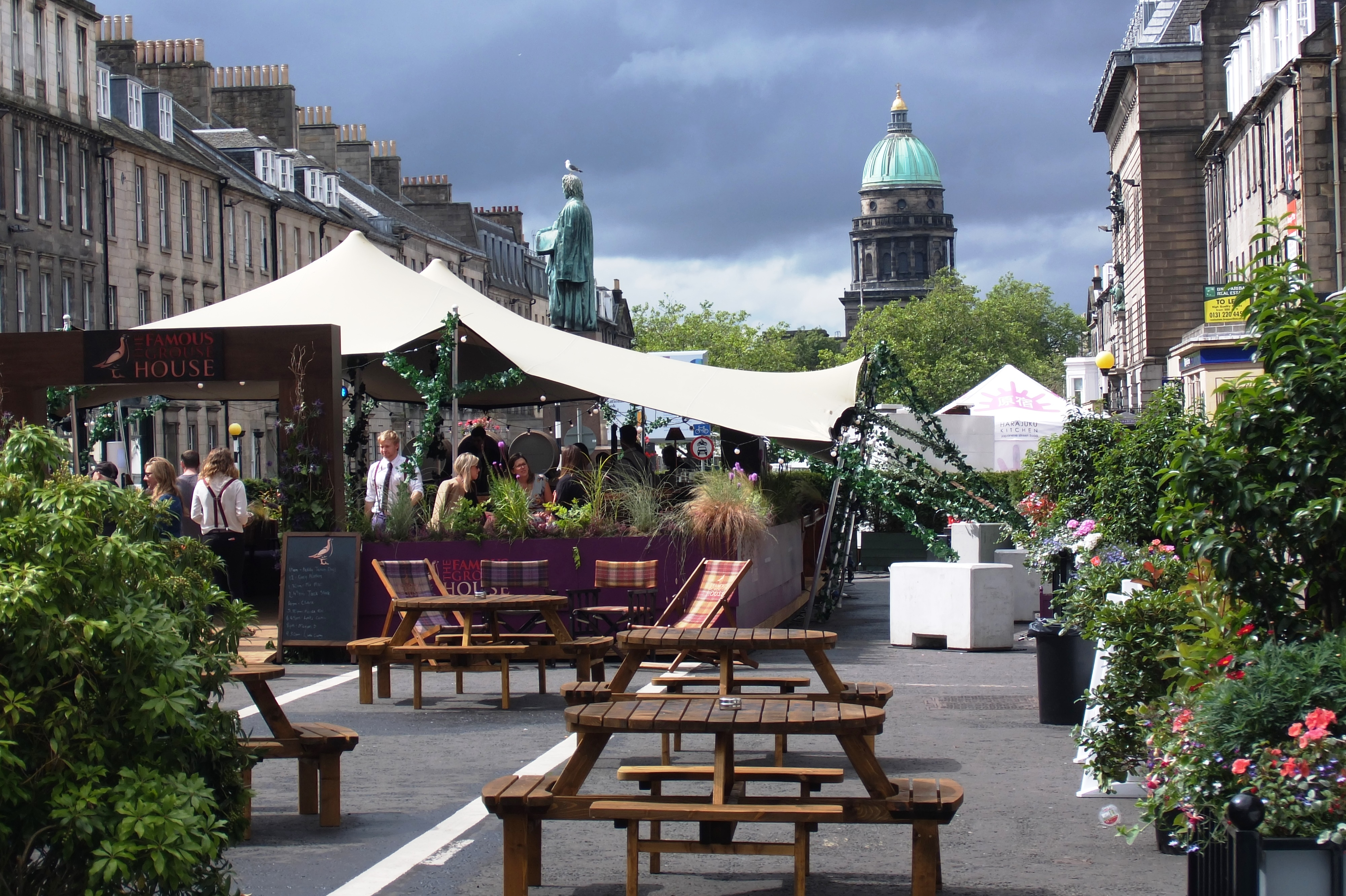
George Street, Edinburgh, during the August festival period 2015.

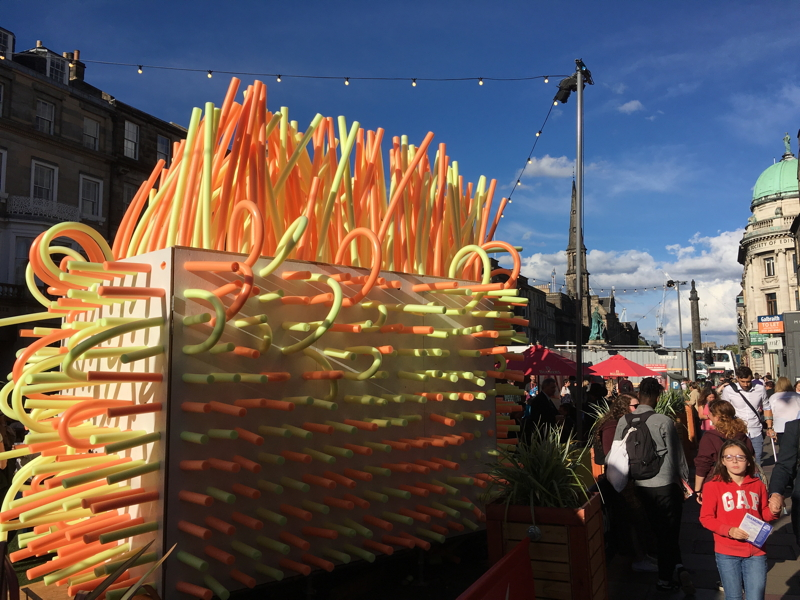
George Street during the Edinburgh Festival in August 2018

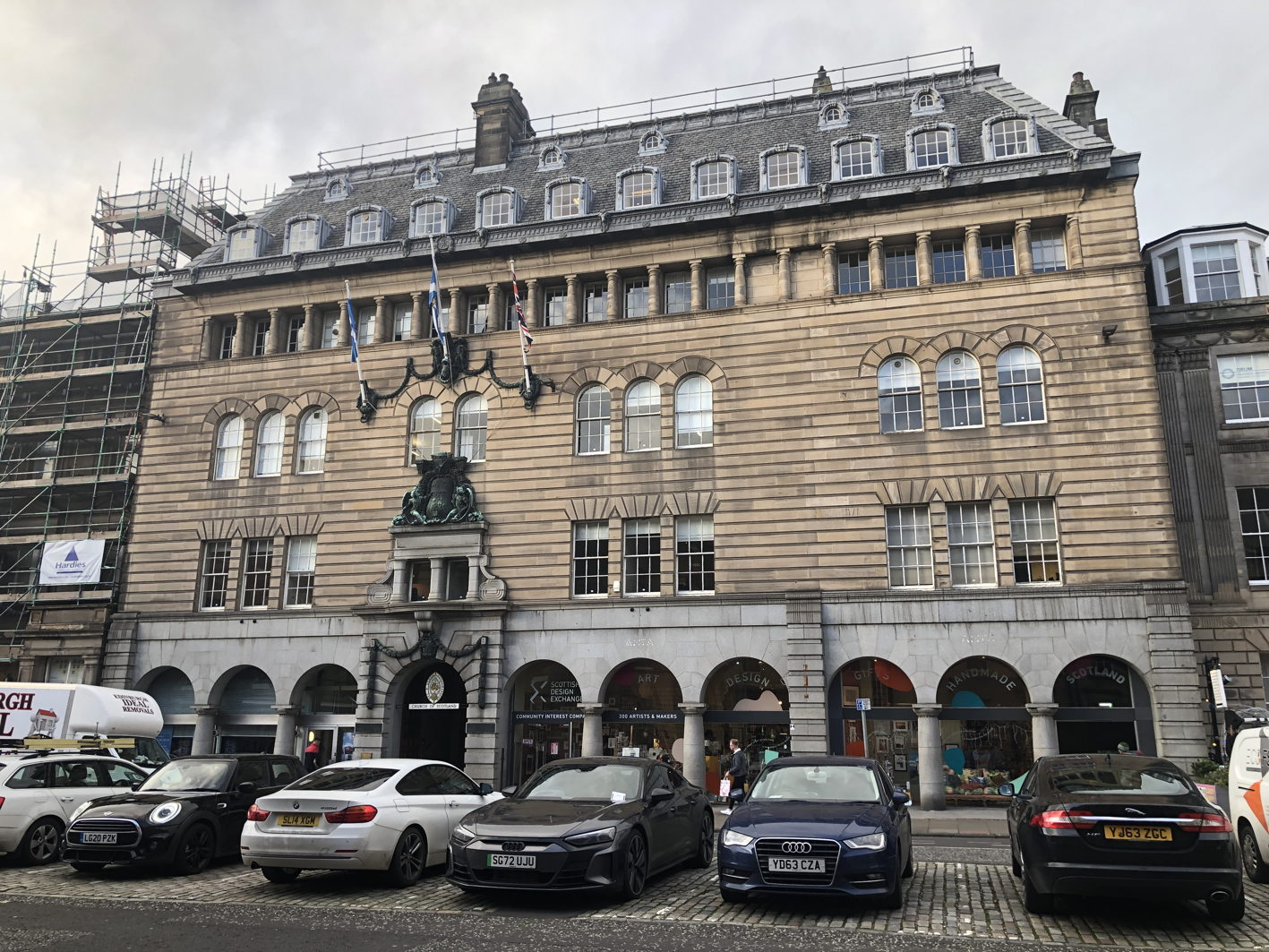
The Church of Scotland, 117-121 George Street
