= Hunting =

Searching, pursuing, and killing wild animals

Hunting is the human practice of seeking, pursuing, capturing, and/or killing wildlife or feral animals. The most common reasons for humans to hunt are to obtain the animal's body to consume their meat and useful animal products (fur/hide, bone/tusks, horn/antler, etc.), and for recreation or taxidermy (see trophy hunting); although, it may also be done for other purposes, such as removing predators dangerous to humans or domestic animals (e.g. wolf hunting), to eliminate pests and nuisance animals that damage crops/livestock/poultry or spread diseases (see varminting), for trade/tourism (see safari), or for ecological conservation against overpopulation and invasive species (commonly called a cull).

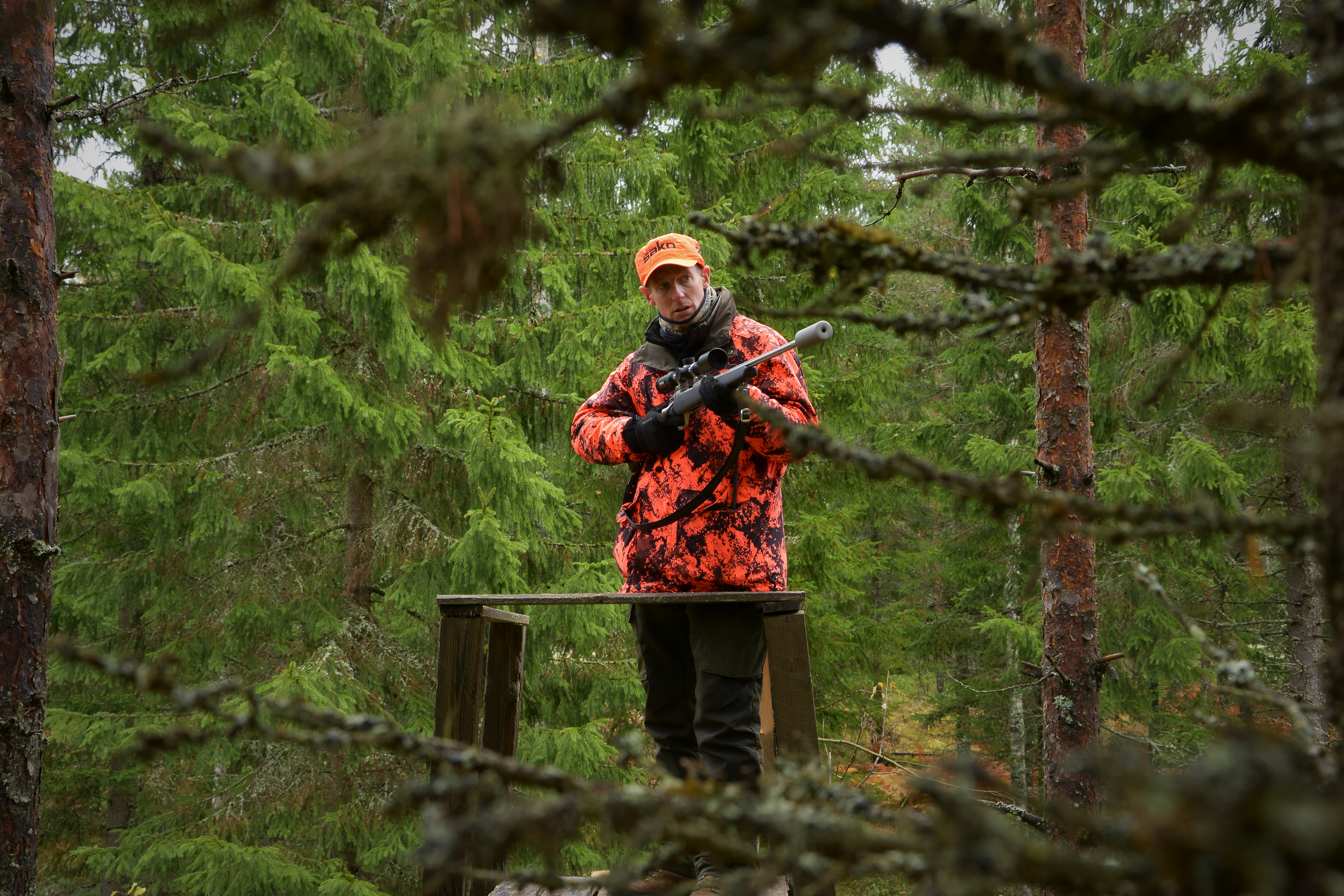
Hunter on a ground stand during a driven hunt in Finland

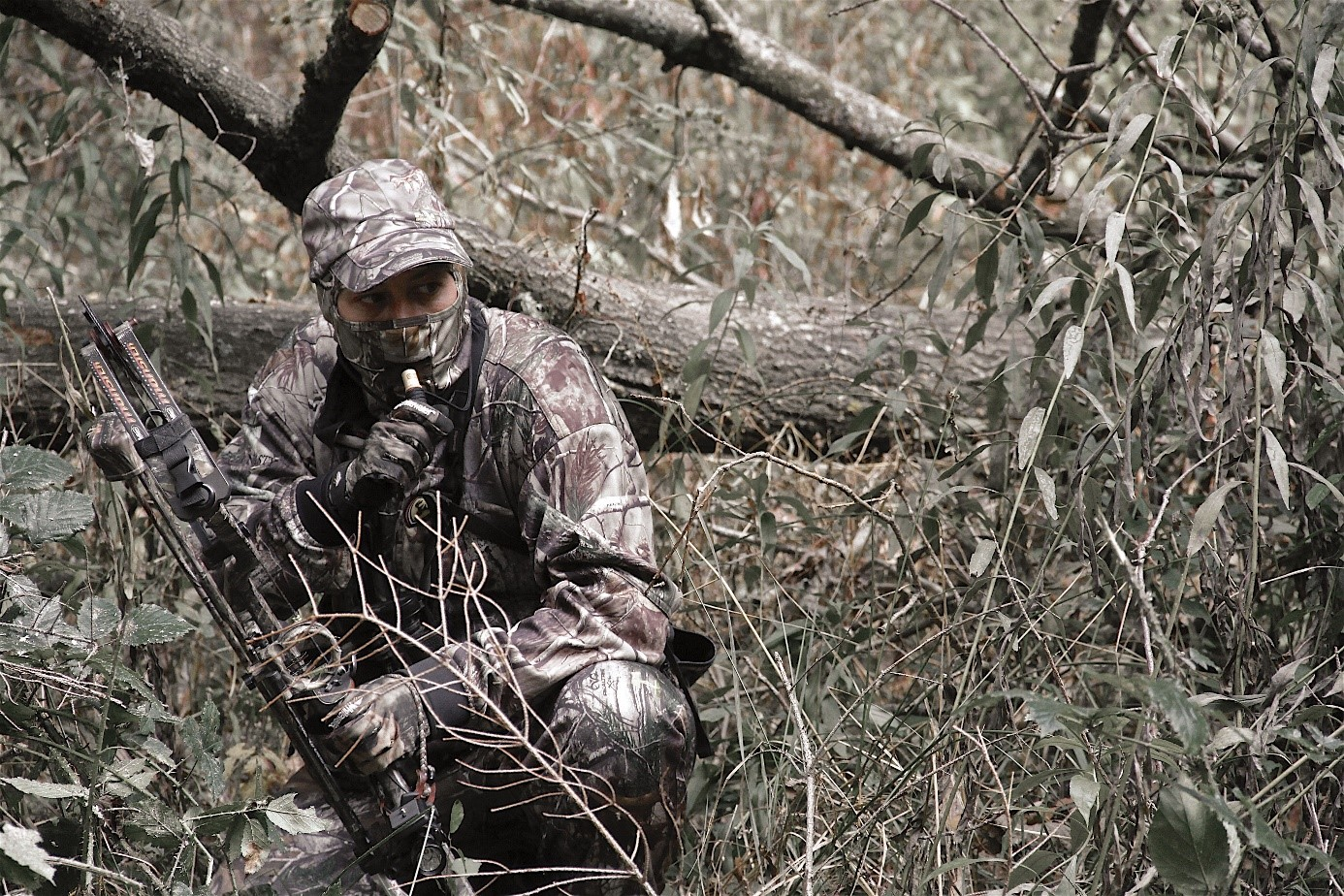
Bowhunter with a compound bow using a call

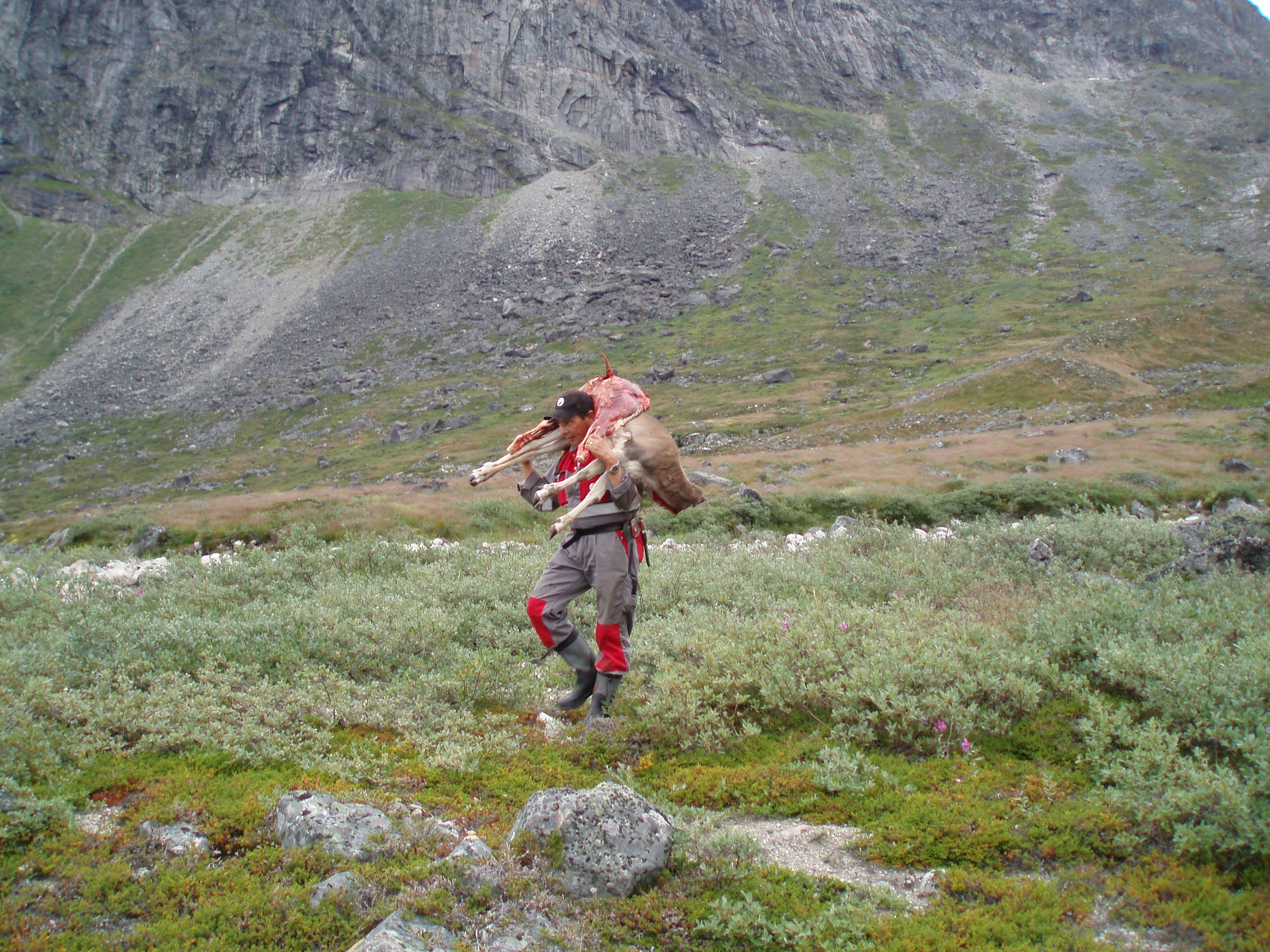
Hunter carrying a reindeer in Greenland

Recreationally hunted species are generally referred to as the game, and are usually mammals and birds. A person participating in a hunt is a hunter or huntress; a natural area used for hunting is called a game reserve or hunting range; and an experienced hunter who helps organise a hunt and/or manage the game reserve is also known as a gamekeeper.

Hunting activities by humans arose in Homo erectus or earlier, in the order of millions of years ago. Hunting has become deeply embedded in various human cultures and was once an important part of rural economies—classified by economists as part of primary production alongside forestry, agriculture, and fishery. Modern regulations (see game law) distinguish lawful hunting activities from illegal poaching, which involves the unauthorised and unregulated killing, trapping, or capture of animals.

Apart from food provision, hunting can be a means of population control. Hunting advocates state that regulated hunting can be a necessary component of modern wildlife management; for example, to help maintain a healthy proportion of animal populations within an environment's ecological carrying capacity when natural checks such as natural predators are absent or insufficient, or to provide funding for breeding programs and maintenance of natural reserves and conservation parks. However, excessive hunting has also heavily contributed to the endangerment, extirpation and extinction of many animals. Some animal rights and anti-hunting activists regard hunting as a cruel, perverse and unnecessary blood sport. Certain hunting practices, such as canned hunts and trophy tours (especially to poor countries), are considered unethical and exploitative even by some hunters.

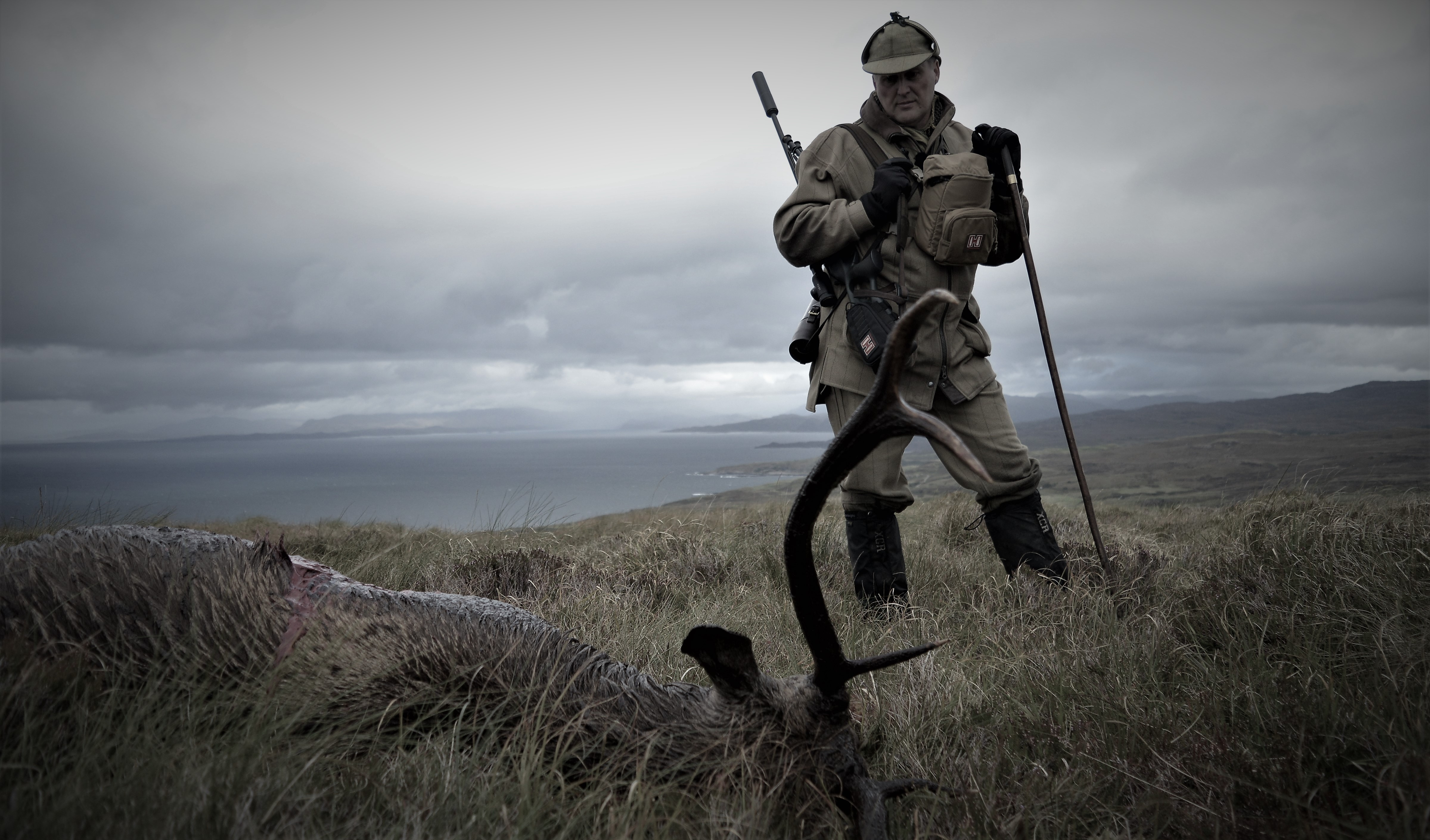
Professional deerstalker standing over a downed red stag in Scotland

Marine mammals such as whales and pinnipeds are also targets of hunting, both recreationally and commercially, often with heated controversies regarding the morality, ethics and legality of such practices. The pursuit, harvesting or catch and release of fish and aquatic cephalopods and crustaceans is called fishing, which is widely accepted and not commonly categorised as a form of hunting. It is also not considered hunting to pursue animals without intent to kill them, as in wildlife photography, birdwatching, or scientific-research activities which involve tranquilizing or tagging of animals, although green hunting is still called so.

Hunting supplements the gathering of plants and mushrooms in foraging societies. The collection of local arthropods such as insects for food, common in such societies and still in practice today, occupies a middle ground between hunting and gathering but is seldom regarded as hunting, though some do so; this applies also to the netting and trapping of arthropods for scientific or hobby purposes.

Skillful tracking and acquisition of an elusive target has caused the word hunt to be used in standard vernacular as a metaphor for searching and obtaining something, as in "treasure hunting", "bargain hunting", "hunting for votes" and even "hunting down" corruption and waste.

== Etymology ==
The word hunt serves as both a noun ("the act, the practice, or an instance of hunting") and a verb ("to pursue for food or in sport"). The noun has been dated to the early 12th century, from the verb hunt: Old English had huntung, huntoþ. The meaning of "a body of persons associated for the purpose of hunting with a pack of hounds" is first recorded in the 1570s; hunting as "The act of searching for someone or something" is from about 1600.

The verb, Old English huntian "to chase game" (transitive and intransitive), perhaps developed from hunta "hunter," is related to hentan "to seize," from Proto-Germanic huntojan (the source also of Gothic hinþan "to seize, capture," Old High German hunda "booty"), which is of uncertain origin. The general sense of "search diligently" (for anything) is first recorded c. 1200.

== Types ==
- Recreational hunting, also known as trophy hunting, sport hunting, or "sporting"
  - Big game hunting
    - Big Five game (lion, elephant, African buffalo, African leopard, black rhinoceros)
    - Bear hunting
    - Bison hunting
    - Boar hunting
    - Tiger hunting
    - Reindeer and caribou hunting
    - Deer hunting/stalking
    - Elk hunting
  - Medium/small game hunting
    - Fox hunting
    - Mink hunting
    - Coon hunting
    - Hare coursing
    - Squirrel hunting
  - Fowling
    - Waterfowl hunting
    - Shorebird hunting (snipe, woodcock, curlew, sandpiper, plover)
    - Upland hunting (quail, pheasant, dove, grouse, turkey)
- Pest control/nuisance management
  - Predator hunting
    - Wolf hunting
    - Jackal coursing
    - Coyote hunting
    - Bobcat hunting
  - Varmint hunting
    - Rabbiting
    - Rook shooting
    - Culling
- Commercial hunting and traditional sustenance hunting
  - Seal hunting
  - Whaling, dolphin drive, dugong hunting
  - Alligator hunting
  - Kangaroo hunting
- Other
  - Falconry
  - Green hunting
  - Poaching
  - Trapping

== History ==
=== Lower to Middle Paleolithic ===
Hunting has a long history. It predates the emergence of Homo sapiens (anatomically modern humans) and may even predate the genus Homo.

The oldest undisputed evidence for hunting dates to the Early Pleistocene, consistent with the emergence and early dispersal of Homo erectus about 1.7 million years ago (Acheulean). While it is undisputed that Homo erectus were hunters, the importance of this for the emergence of Homo erectus from its australopithecine ancestors, including the production of stone tools and eventually the control of fire, is emphasised in the so-called "hunting hypothesis" and de-emphasised in scenarios that stress omnivory and social interaction.

There is no direct evidence for hunting predating Homo erectus, in either Homo habilis or in Australopithecus. The early hominid ancestors of humans were probably frugivores or omnivores, with a partially carnivorous diet from scavenging rather than hunting. Evidence for australopithecine meat consumption was presented in the 1990s. It has nevertheless often been assumed that at least occasional hunting behaviour may have been present well before the emergence of Homo. This can be argued on the basis of comparison with chimpanzees, the closest extant relatives of humans, who also engage in hunting, indicating that the behavioural trait may have been present in the Chimpanzee–human last common ancestor as early as 5 million years ago.

The common chimpanzee (Pan troglodytes) regularly engages in troop predation behaviour, where bands of beta males are led by an alpha male. Bonobos (Pan paniscus) have also been observed to occasionally engage in group hunting, although more rarely than chimpanzees, mainly subsisting on a frugivorous diet. Indirect evidence for Oldowan era hunting, by early Homo or late Australopithecus, has been presented in a 2009 study based on an Oldowan site in southwestern Kenya.

Lewis Binford (1986), an American archaeologist, criticised the idea that early hominids and early humans were hunters. On the basis of the analysis of the skeletal remains of the consumed animals, he concluded that hominids and early humans were mostly scavengers, not hunters. Robert Blumenschine (1986) proposed the idea of confrontational scavenging, which involves challenging and scaring off other predators after they have made a kill, which he suggests could have been the leading method of obtaining protein-rich meat by early humans.

Stone spearheads dated as early as 500,000 years ago were found in South Africa. Wood does not preserve well, however, and Craig Stanford, a primatologist and professor of anthropology at the University of Southern California, has suggested that the discovery of spear use by chimpanzees probably means that early humans used wooden spears as well, perhaps, five million years ago. The earliest dated find of surviving wooden hunting spears dates to the very end of the Lower Paleolithic, about 300,000 years ago. The Schöningen spears, found in 1976 in Germany, are associated with Homo heidelbergensis.

The hunting hypothesis sees the emergence of behavioral modernity in the Middle Paleolithic as directly related to hunting, including mating behaviour, the establishment of language, culture, and religion, mythology and animal sacrifice. Sociologist David Nibert of Wittenberg University argued that the emergence of the organized hunting of animals undermined the communal, egalitarian nature of early human societies, with the status of women and less powerful males declining as the status of men quickly became associated with their success at hunting, which also increased human violence within these societies. However, 9000-year-old remains of a female hunter along with a toolkit of projectile points and animal processing implements were discovered at the Andean site of Wilamaya Patjxa, Puno District in Peru.

Early humans progressively invented tools and techniques for trapping animals. The earliest spears were crafted from wood, with tips toughened by burning. By 15,000 BC, hunters employed wooden and bone spear-launchers to enhance force and distance. These devices were frequently adorned with carvings of creatures.

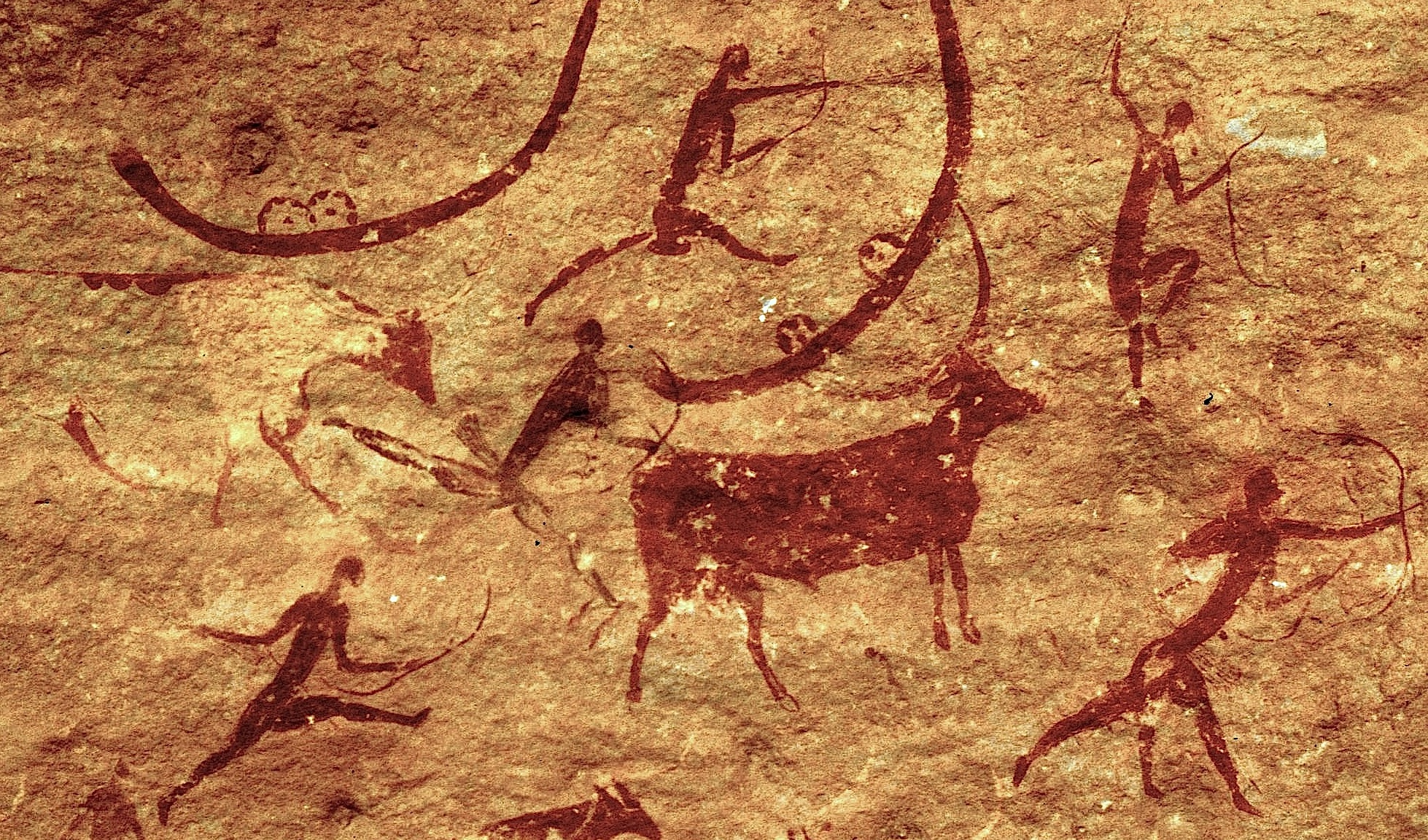
Saharan rock art with prehistoric archers

=== Upper Paleolithic to Mesolithic ===
Evidence exists that hunting may have been one of the multiple, or possibly the main, environmental factors leading to the Holocene extinction of megafauna and their replacement by smaller herbivores.

Humans are thought to have played a very significant role in the extinction of the Australian megafauna that was widespread prior to human occupation.

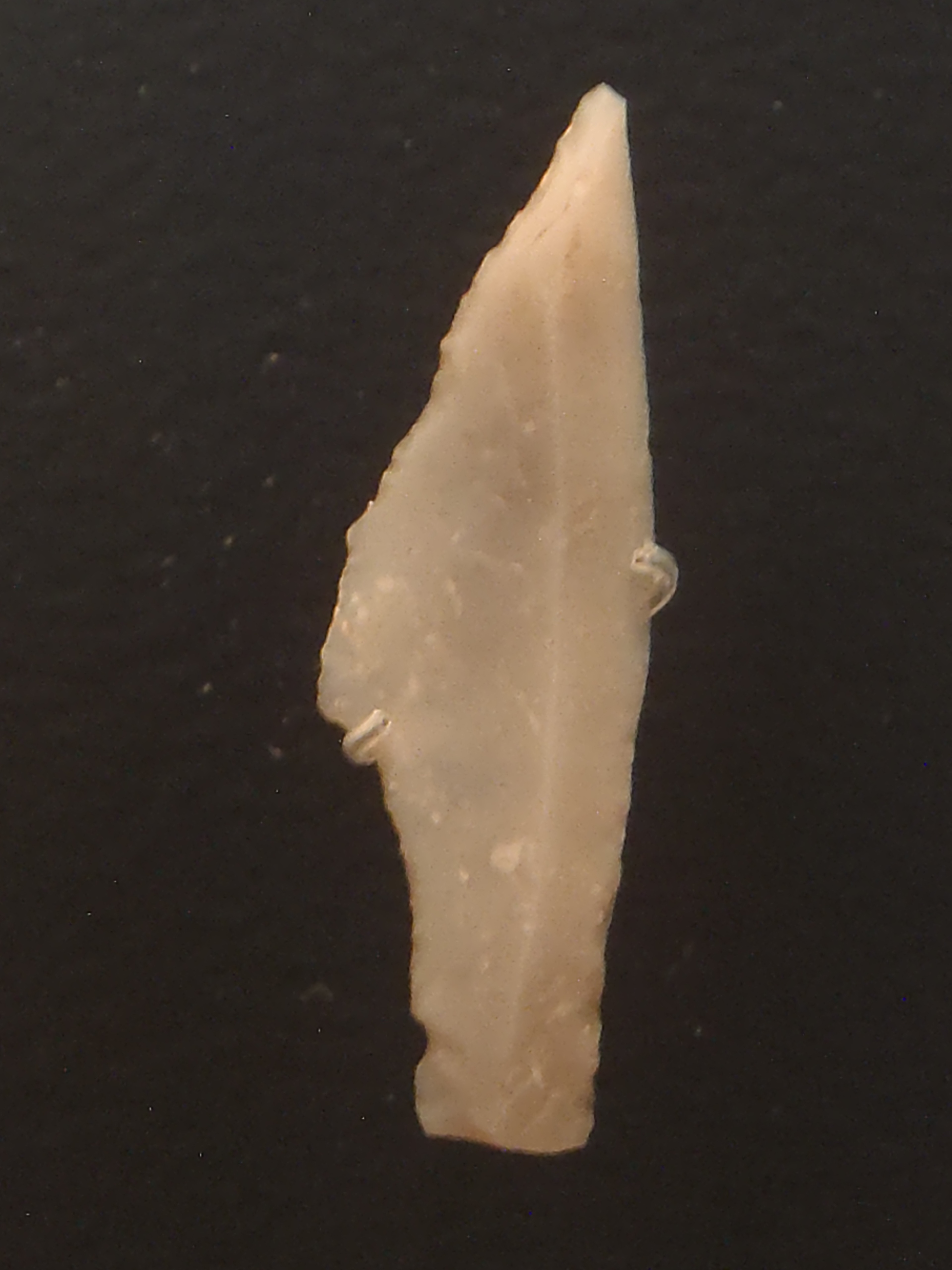
Sharp flint piece from Bjerlev Hede in central Jutland. Dated around 12,500 BC and considered the oldest hunting tool from Denmark.

Hunting was a crucial component of hunter-gatherer societies before the domestication of livestock and the dawn of agriculture, beginning about 11,000 years ago in some parts of the world. In addition to the spear, hunting weapons developed during the Upper Paleolithic include the atlatl (a spear-thrower; before 30,000 years ago) and the bow (18,000 years ago). By the Mesolithic, hunting strategies had diversified with the development of these more far-reaching weapons and the domestication of the dog about 15,000 years ago. Evidence puts the earliest known mammoth hunting in Asia with spears to approximately 16,200 years ago.

Many species of animals have been hunted throughout history. One theory is that in North America and Eurasia, caribou and wild reindeer "may well be the species of single greatest importance in the entire anthropological literature on hunting" (see also Reindeer Age), although the varying importance of different species depended on the geographic location.

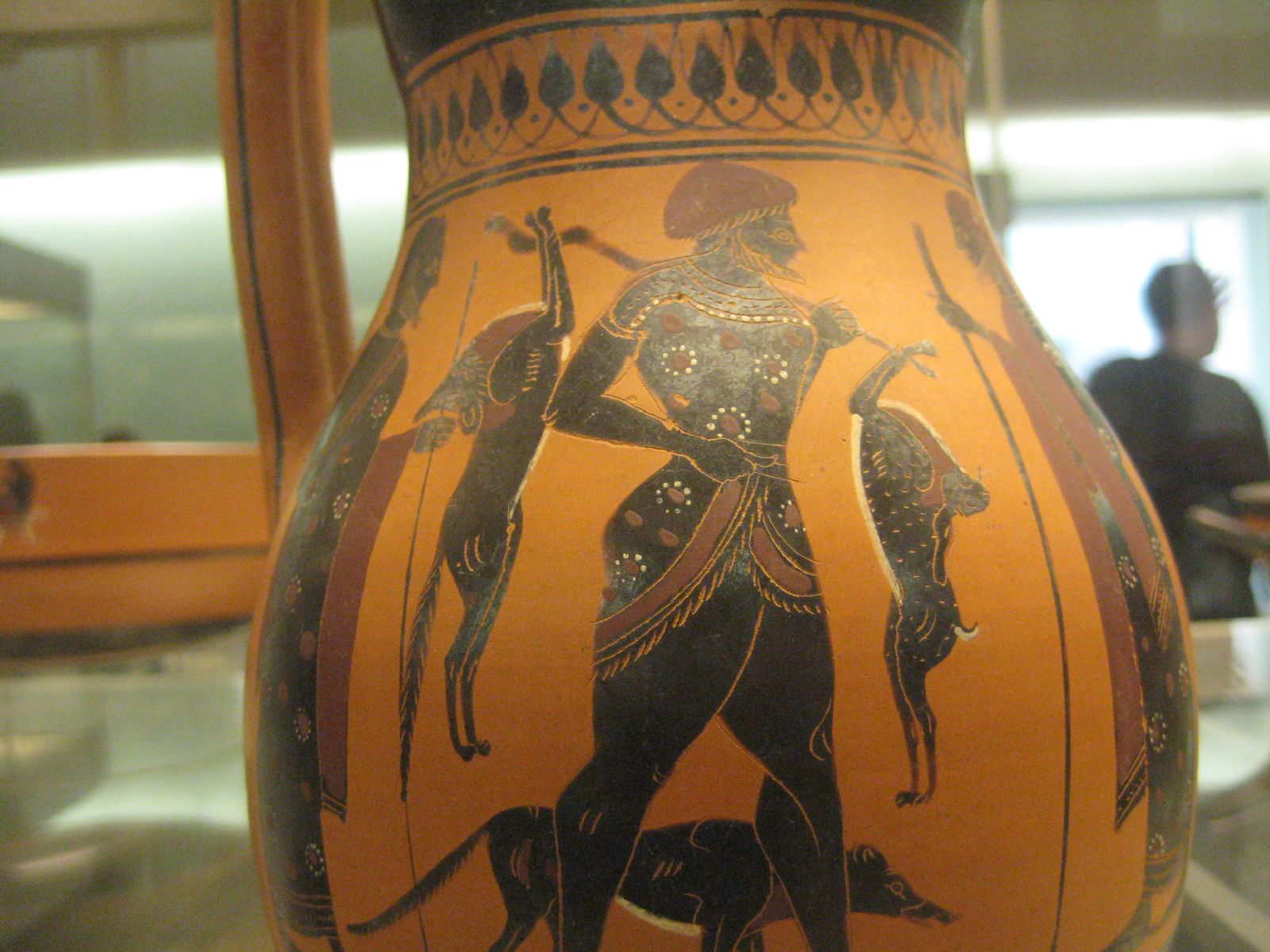
Ancient Greek black-figure pottery depicting the return of a hunter and his dog; made in Athens c. 540 BC, found in Rhodes

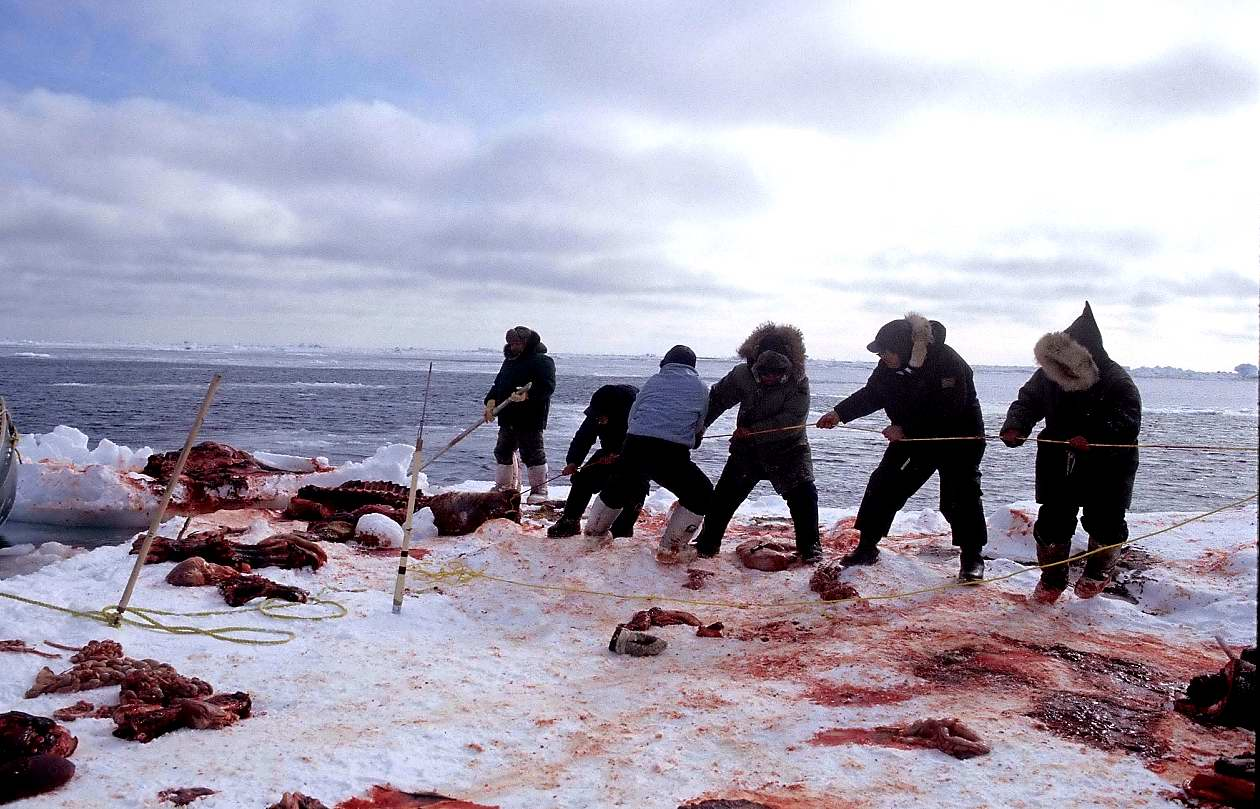
Inuit hunting walrus, 1999

Mesolithic hunter-gathering lifestyles remained prevalent in some parts of the Americas, Sub-Saharan Africa, and Siberia, as well as all of Australia, until the European Age of Discovery: they still persist in some tribal societies, albeit in rapid decline. Peoples that preserved Paleolithic hunting-gathering until the recent past include some Indigenous peoples of the Amazonas (Aché), some Central and Southern African (San peoples), some peoples of New Guinea (Fayu), the Mlabri of Thailand and Laos, the Vedda people of Sri Lanka, and a handful of uncontacted peoples. In Africa, one of the last remaining hunter-gatherer tribes are the Hadza of Tanzania.

=== Neolithic and Antiquity ===
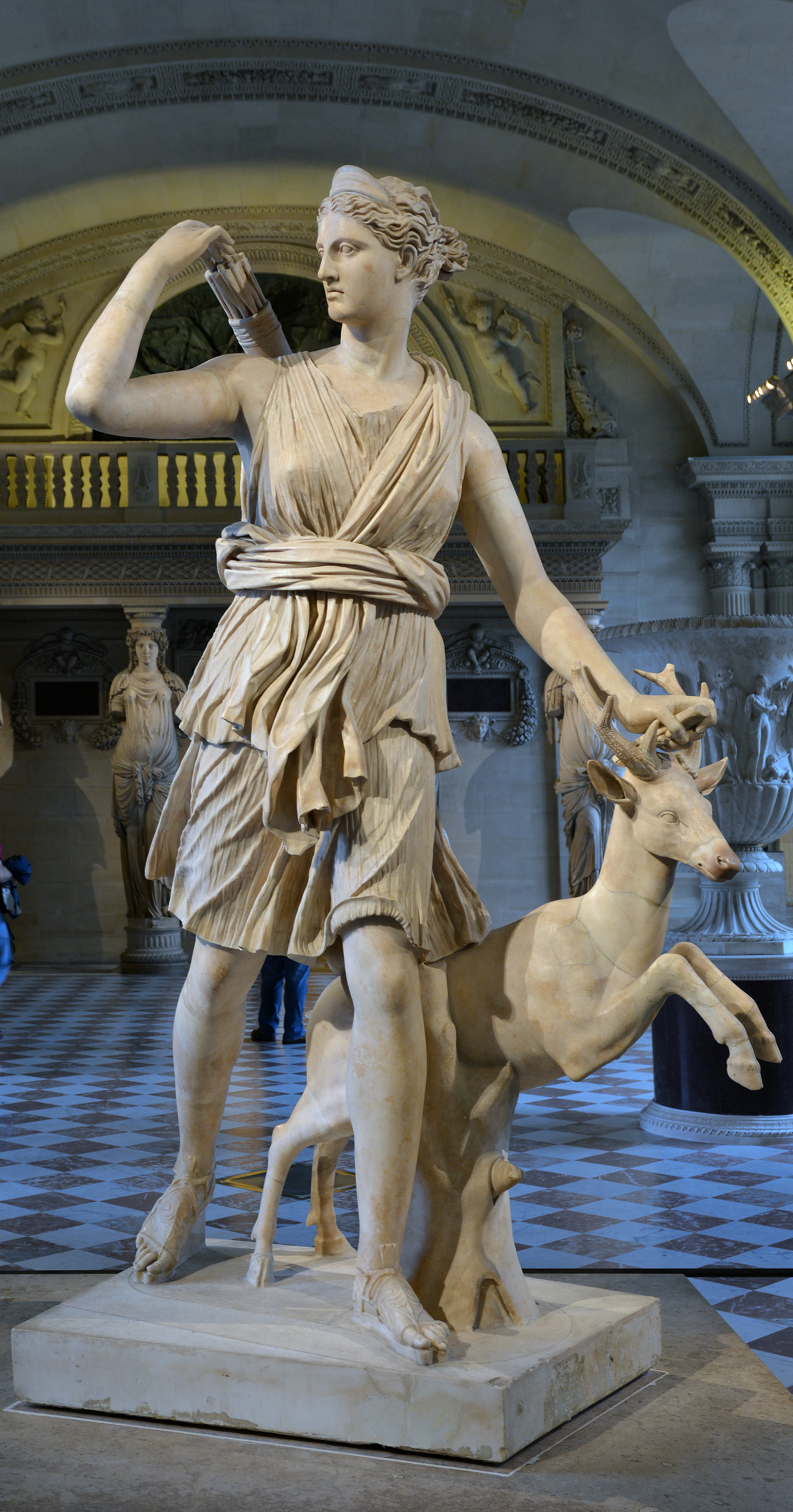
Artemis with a Hind, a Roman copy of an Ancient Greek sculpture, c. 325 BC, by Leochares.

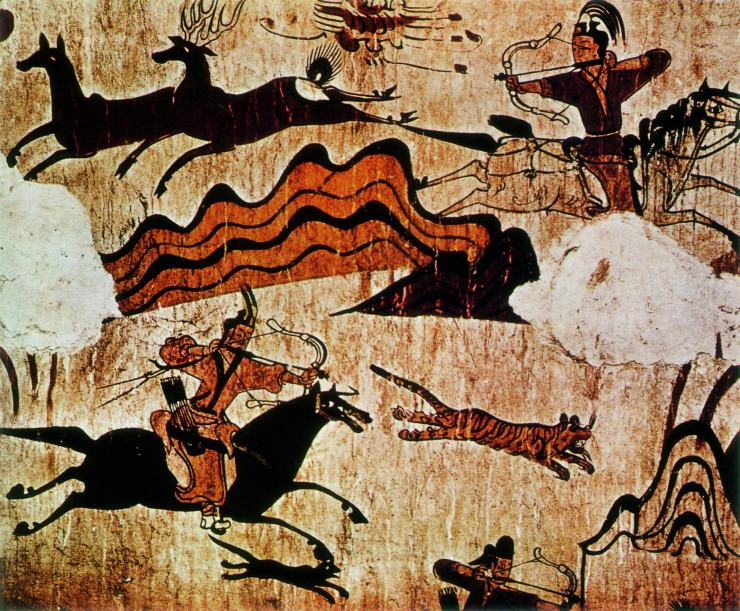
An example of a Goguryeo tomb mural of hunting, middle of the first millennium.

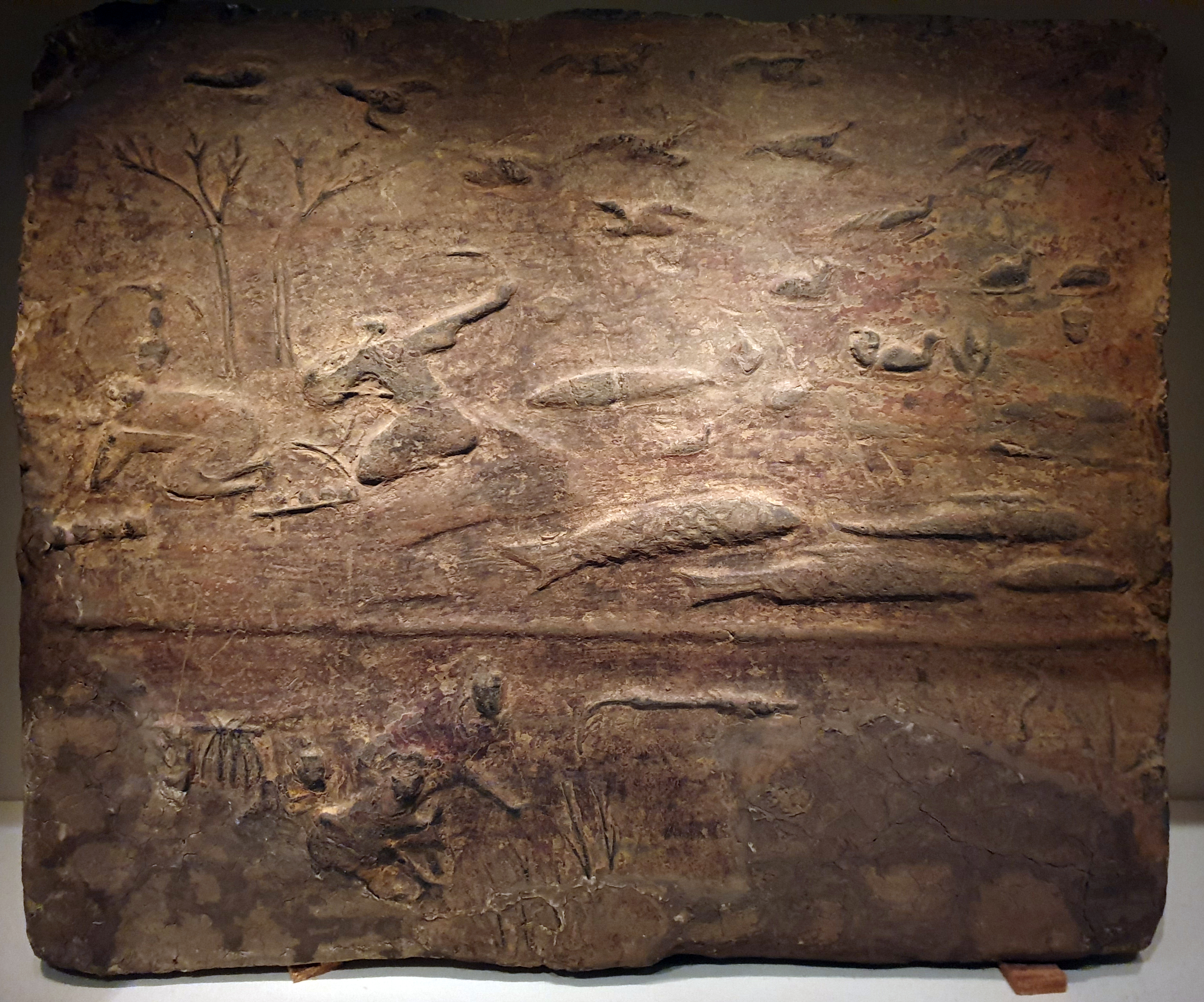
Han dynasty tomb brick depicting a fishing and hunting scene

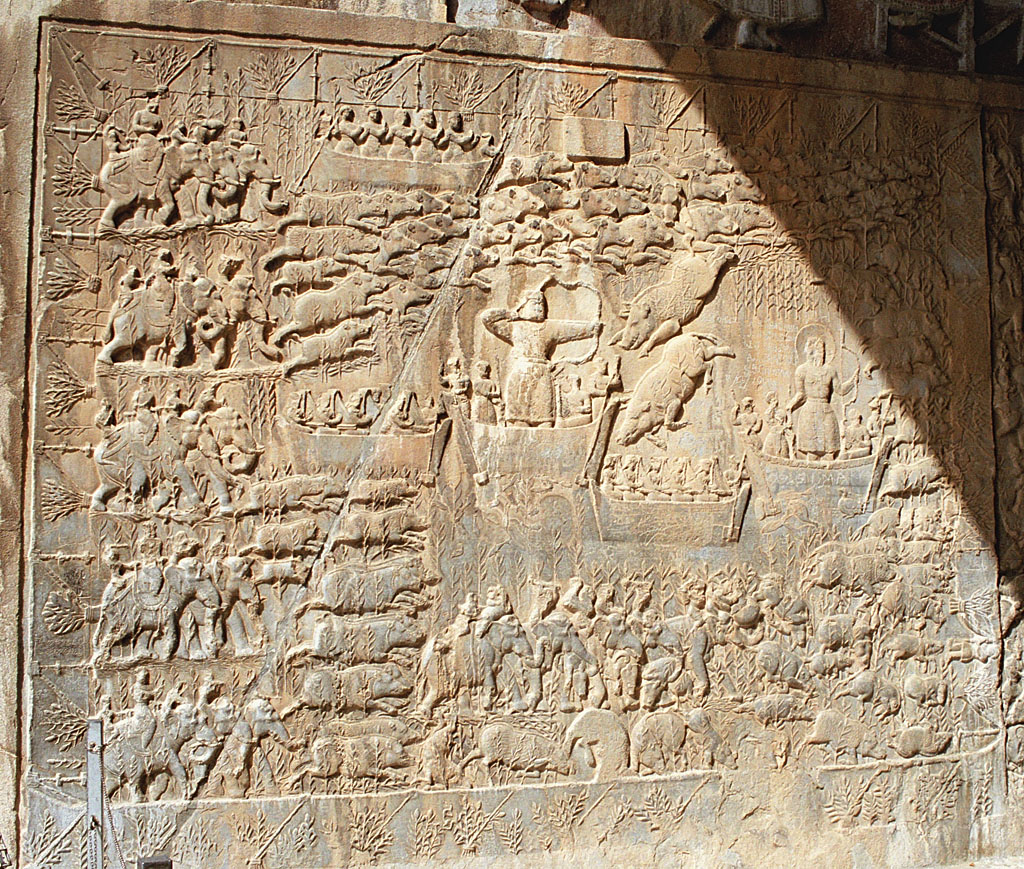
Low-relief the boar hunt, Taq-e Bostan

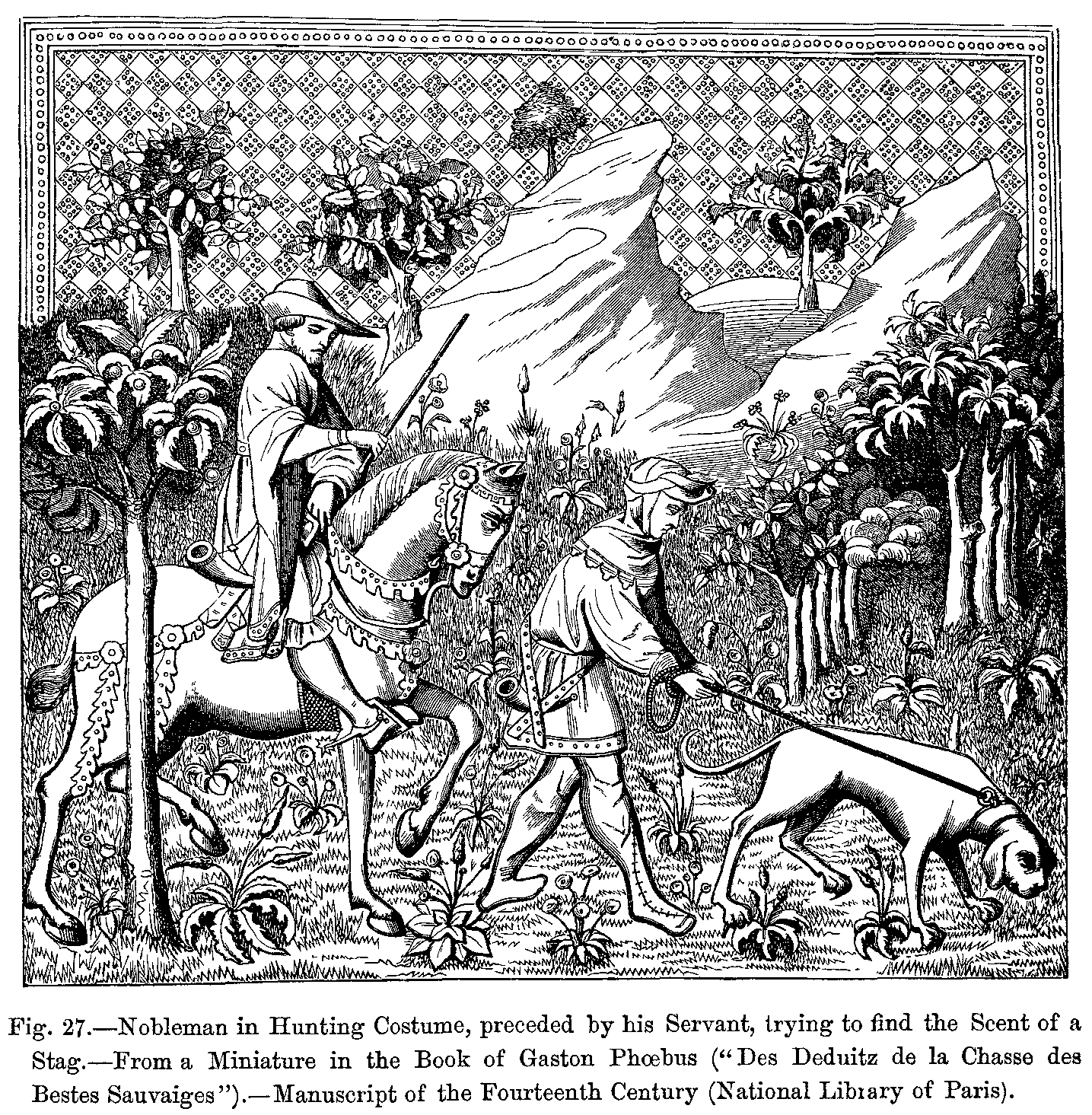
Nobleman in hunting costume with his servant following the scent of a stag, 14th century

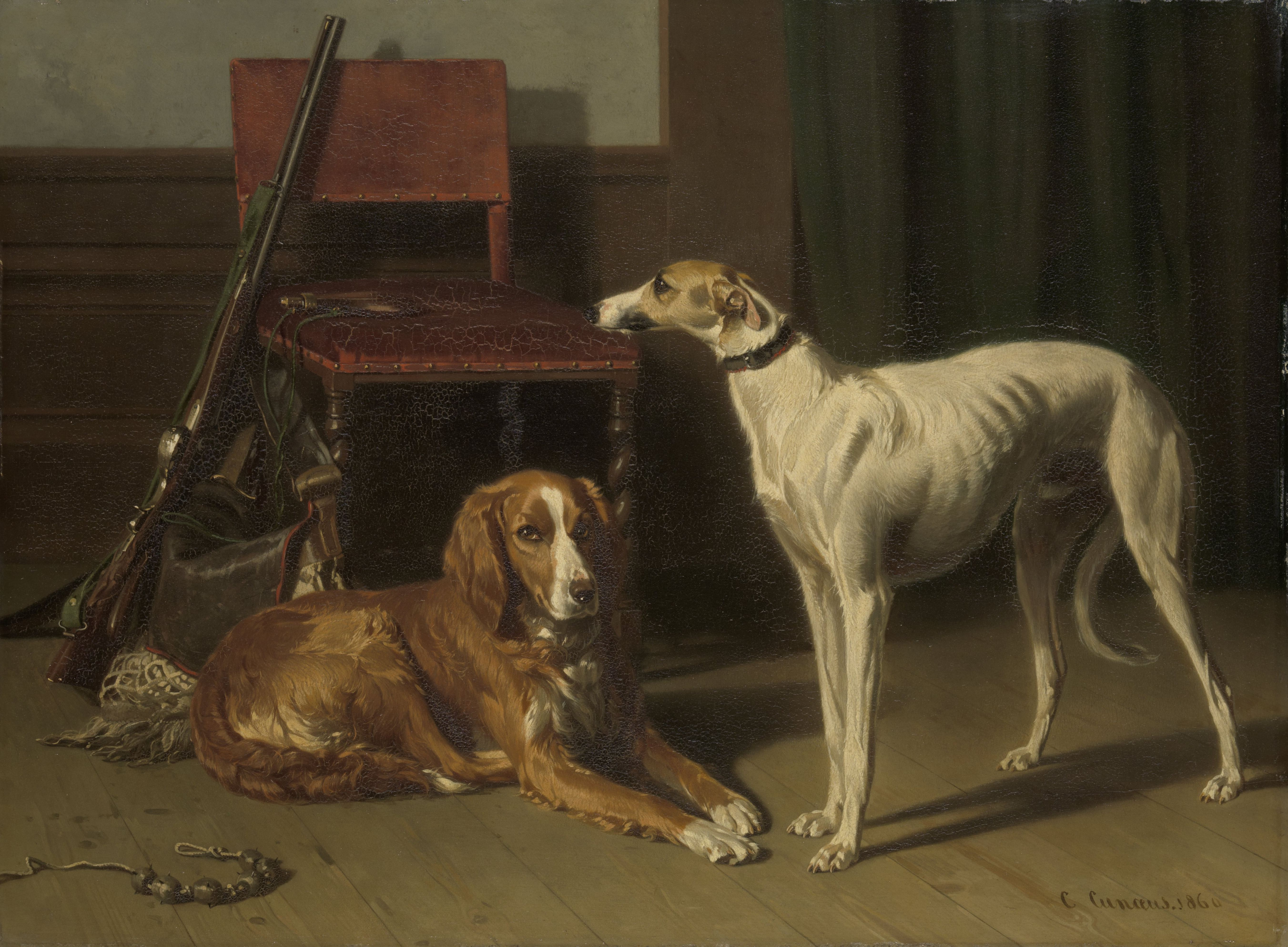
Hunting Companions, Dutch 19th-century painting featuring two dogs, a shotgun and a game bag

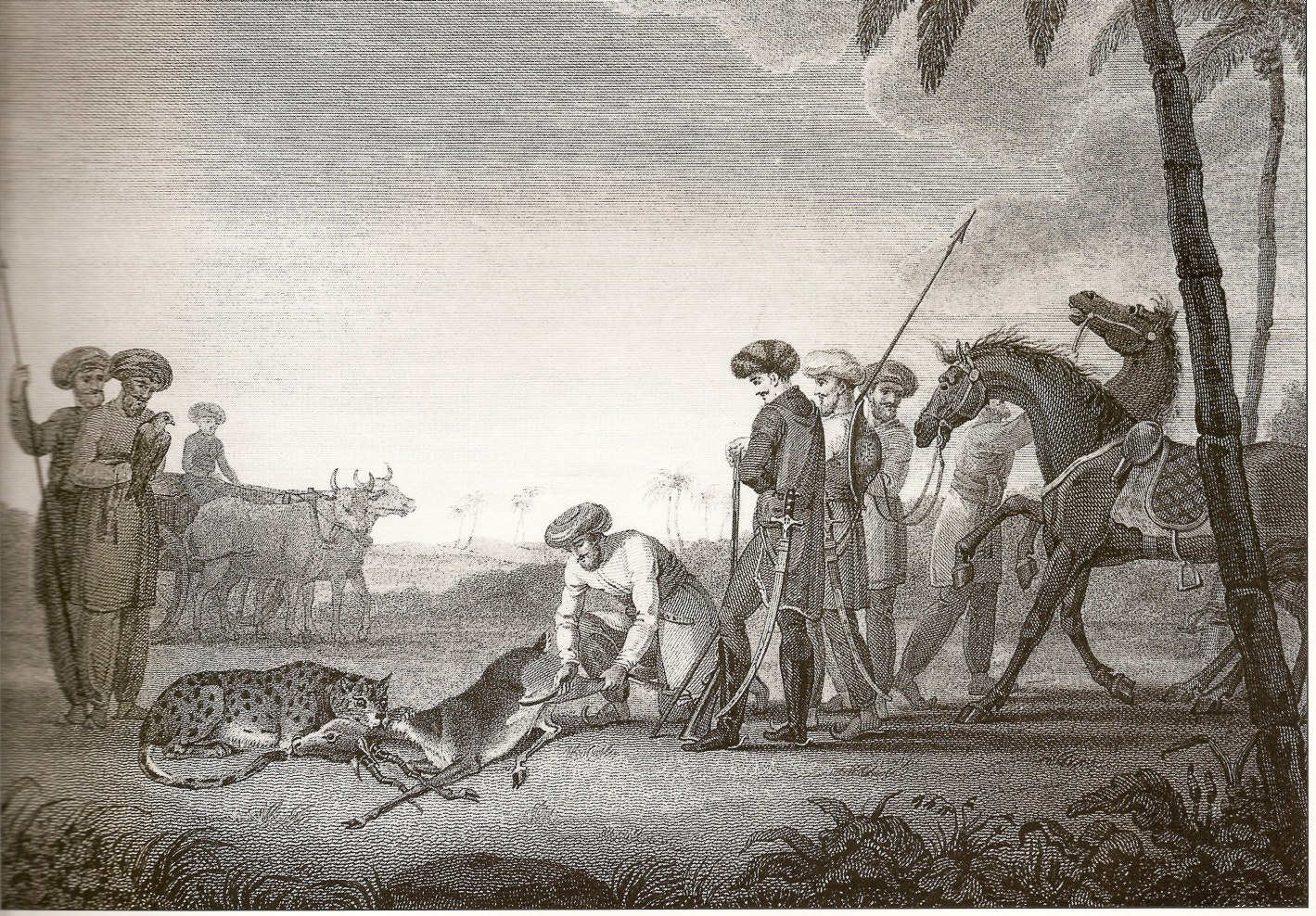
Mughal aristocrats hunting a blackbuck alongside an Asiatic cheetah, 1812

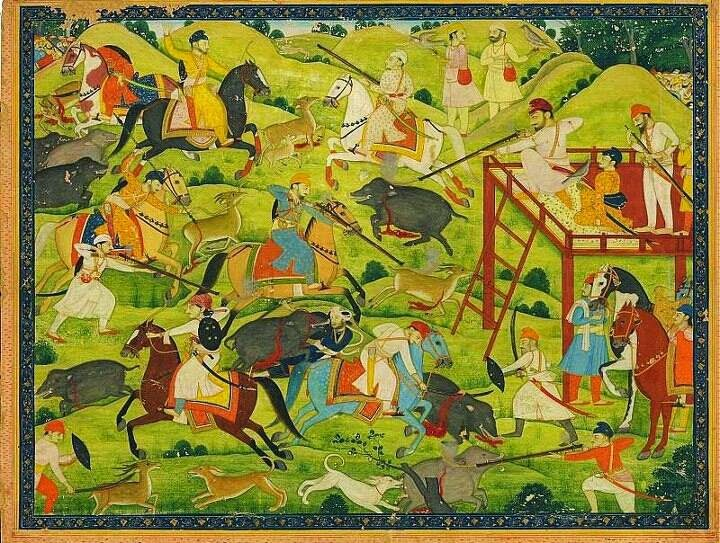
A group of Sikhs hunting (unknown Pahari artist, 18th century)

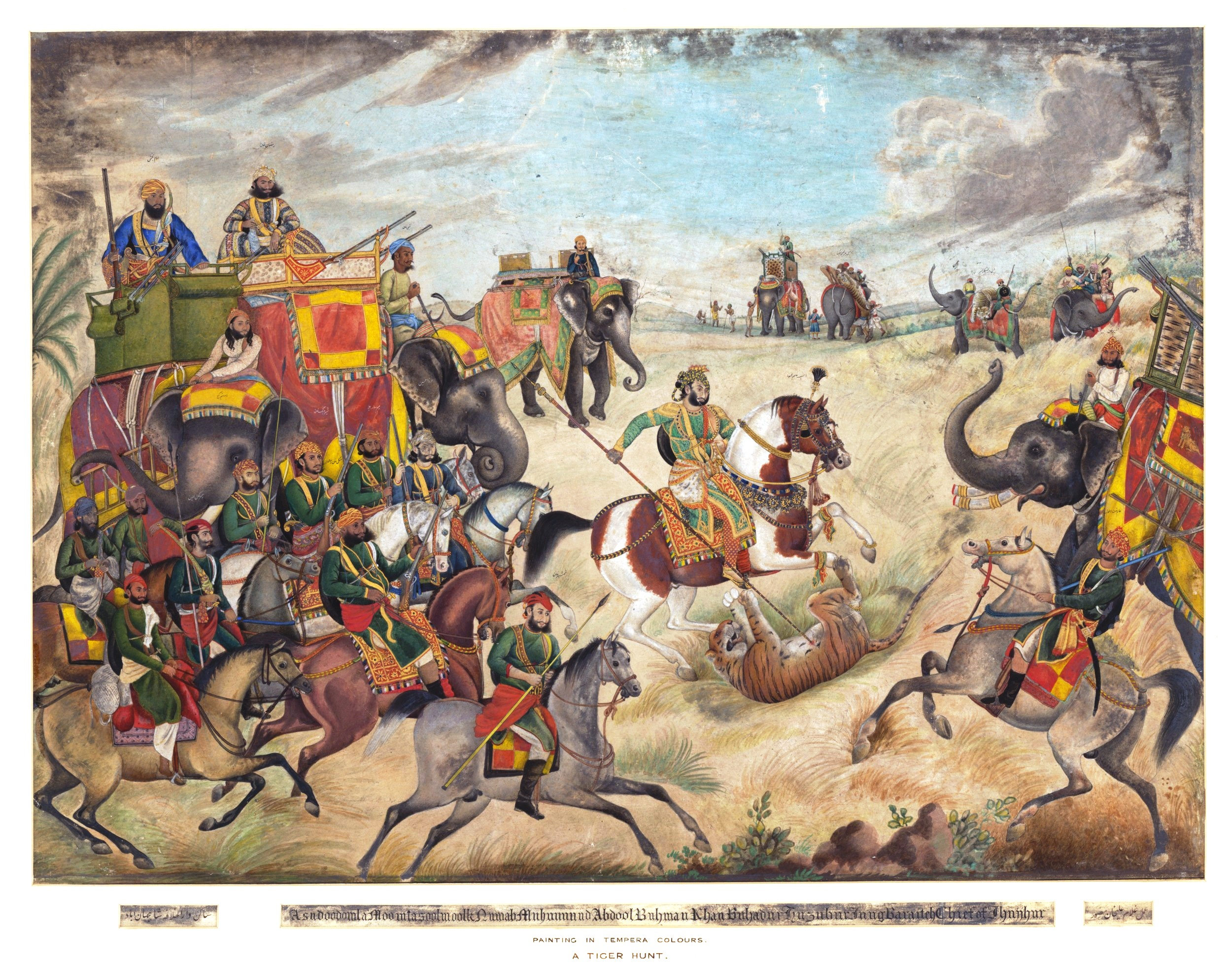
A tiger hunt at Jhajjar, Rohtak district, Punjab, c. 1820

Even as animal domestication became relatively widespread, and after the development of agriculture, hunting usually remained a significant contributor to the human food-supply. The supplementary meat and materials from hunting included protein, bone for implements, sinew for cordage, fur, feathers, rawhide and leather used in clothing.

Hunting is still vital in marginal climates, especially those unsuited for pastoral uses or for agriculture. For example, Inuit in the Arctic trap and hunt animals for clothing and use the skins of sea mammals to make kayaks, clothing, and footwear.

On ancient reliefs, especially from Mesopotamia, kings are often depicted by sculptors as hunters of big game, such as lions, and are often portrayed hunting from a war chariot—early examples of royalty symbolically and militaristically engaging in hunting as "the sport of kings".

The cultural and psychological importance of hunting in ancient societies is represented by deities such as the Celtic horned god Cernunnos and lunar goddesses of classical antiquity, the Greek Artemis or Roman Diana. Taboos are often related to hunting, and mythological association of prey species with a divinity could be reflected in hunting restrictions, such as a reserve surrounding a temple. Euripides' tale of Artemis and Actaeon, for example, may be seen as a caution against disrespect of prey or against impudent boasting.

With the domestication of the dog, birds of prey, and the ferret, various forms of animal-aided hunting developed, including venery (scent-hound hunting, such as fox hunting), coursing (sight-hound hunting), falconry, and ferreting. While these are all associated with medieval hunting, over time, various dog breeds were selected by humans for very precise tasks during the hunt, reflected in such names as "pointer" and "setter".

=== Pastoral and agricultural societies ===
Even as agriculture and animal husbandry became more prevalent, hunting often remained as a part of human culture where the environment and social conditions allowed. Hunter-gatherer societies persisted, even when increasingly confined to marginal areas. Within agricultural systems, hunting also served the purpose of killing animals that prey upon domestic and wild animals, or as an attempt to extirpate animals seen by humans as competition for resources such as water or forage.

When hunting moved from a subsistence activity to a selective one, two trends emerged:

1. the development of the role of the specialist hunter, with special training and equipment;
2. the option of hunting as a "sport" for members of an upper social class.

The meaning of the word game in Middle English evolved to include an animal which is hunted. As the domestication of animals for meat grew, subsistence hunting remained among the lowest classes; however, the stylised pursuit of game in European societies became a luxury. Dangerous hunting, such as for lions or wild boars, often done on horseback or from a chariot, had a function similar to tournaments and manly sports. Hunting ranked as an honourable, somewhat competitive pastime to help the aristocracy practice skills of war in times of peace.

In most parts of medieval Europe, the upper class obtained the sole rights to hunt in certain areas of a feudal territory. Game in these areas was used as a source of food and furs, often provided via professional huntsmen, but it was also expected to provide a form of recreation for the aristocracy. The importance of this proprietary view of game can be seen in the Robin Hood legends, in which one of the primary charges against the outlaws is that they "hunt the King's deer". In contrast, settlers in Anglophone colonies gloried democratically in hunting for all.

In medieval Europe, hunting was considered by Johannes Scotus Eriugena to be part of the set of seven mechanical arts.

=== Use of dog ===
Although various other animals have been used to aid the hunter, such as ferrets, the dog has assumed many very important uses to the hunter. The domestication of the dog has led to a symbiotic relationship in which the dog's independence from humans is deferred. Though dogs can survive independently of humans, and in many cases do ferally, when raised or adopted by humans the species tends to defer to its control in exchange for habitation, food, and support.

Dogs today are used to find, chase, retrieve, and sometimes kill game. Dogs allow humans to pursue and kill prey that would otherwise be very difficult or dangerous to hunt. Different breeds of specifically bred hunting dogs are used for different types of hunting. Waterfowl are commonly hunted using retrieving dogs such as the Labrador Retriever, the Golden Retriever, the Chesapeake Bay Retriever, the Brittany Spaniel, and other similar breeds. Game birds are flushed out using flushing spaniels such as the English Springer Spaniel, the various Cocker Spaniels, and similar breeds.

The hunting of wild mammals in England and Wales with dogs was banned under the Hunting Act 2004. The wild mammals include fox, hare, deer and mink. There are, however, exceptions in the Act. Nevertheless, there have been numerous attempts on behalf of activists, pressure groups, etc. to revoke the act over the last two decades.

== Religion ==
Many prehistoric deities are depicted as predators or prey of humans, often in a zoomorphic form, perhaps alluding to the importance of hunting for most Palaeolithic cultures.

In many pagan religions, specific rituals are conducted before or after a hunt; the rituals done may vary according to the species hunted or the season in which the hunt is taking place. Oftentimes, a hunting ground or hunting for one or more species was reserved or prohibited in the context of a temple cult. In Roman religion, Diana is the goddess of the hunt.

=== Indian and Eastern religions ===
Hindu scriptures describe hunting as an occupation, as well as a sport of the kingly; even figures considered divine are described to have engaged in hunting. One of the names of the god Shiva is Mrigavyadha ('deer-slayer'). The word Mriga, in many Indian languages including Malayalam, not only stands for deer, but for all animals and animal instincts (Mriga Thrishna). Shiva, as Mrigavyadha, is the one who destroys the animal instincts in human beings.

In the epic Ramayana, Dasharatha, the father of Rama, is said to have the ability to hunt in the dark. During one of his hunting expeditions, he accidentally killed Shravana, mistaking him for game. During Rama's exile in the forest, Ravana kidnapped his wife, Sita, from their hut, while Rama was asked by Sita to capture a golden deer, and his brother Lakshmana went after him. According to the Mahabharata, Pandu, the father of the Pandavas, accidentally killed the sage Kindama and his wife with an arrow, mistaking them for a deer.

Jainism teaches followers to have tremendous respect for all of life. Prohibitions for hunting and meat eating are the fundamental conditions for being a Jain.

Buddhism's first precept is the respect for all sentient life. The general approach by all Buddhists is to avoid killing any living animals. Buddha explained the issue by saying "all fear death; comparing others with oneself, one should neither kill nor cause to kill."

In Sikhism, only meat obtained from hunting, or slaughtered with the Jhatka is permitted. The Sikh gurus, especially Guru Hargobind and Guru Gobind Singh, were ardent hunters. Many old Sikh Rehatnamas (codes of conduct), like Prem Sumārag, recommend hunting wild boar and deer. However, among modern Sikhs, the practice of hunting has died down, with some even saying that all meat is forbidden.

=== Christianity, Judaism, and Islam ===
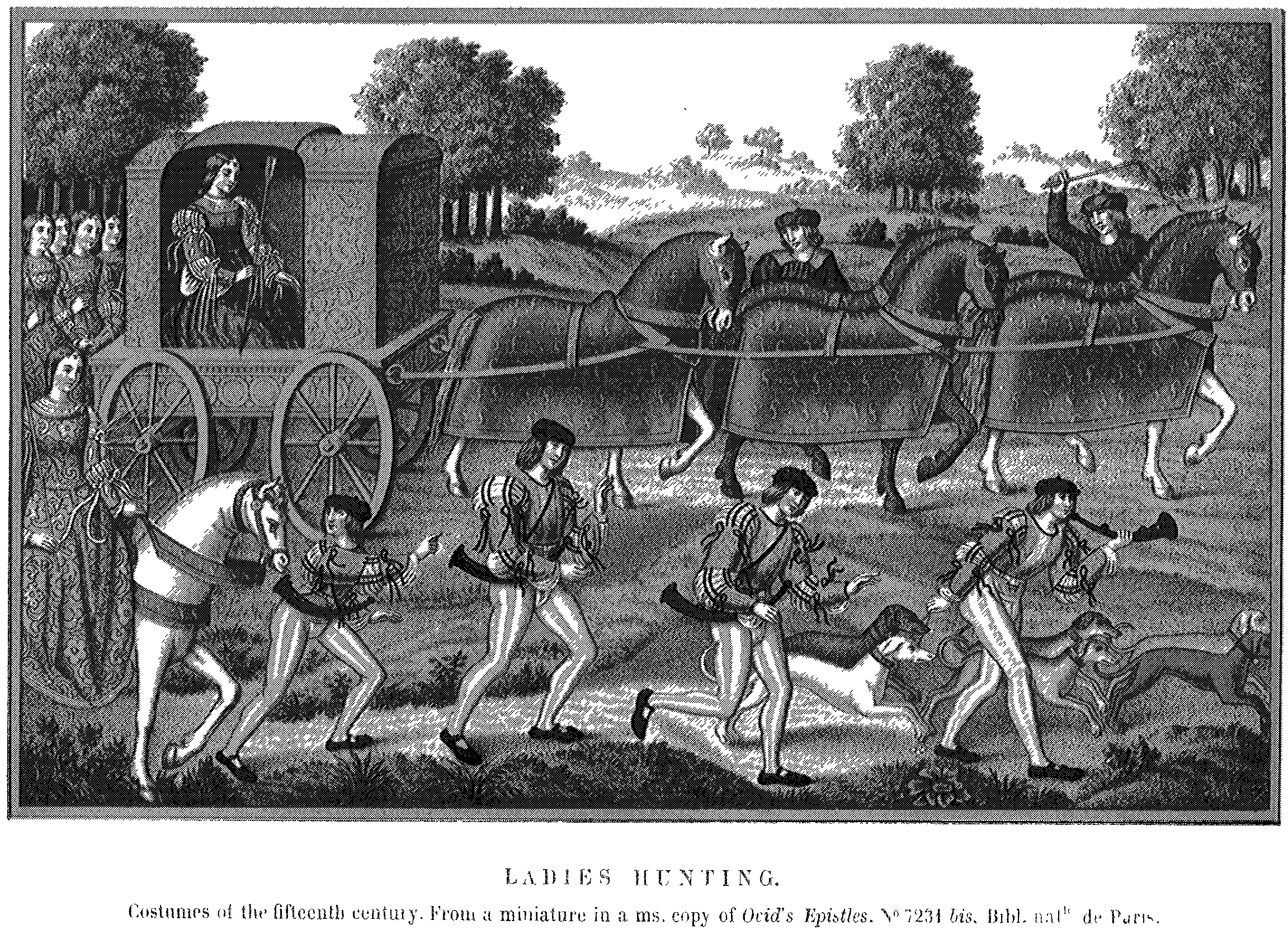
Ladies hunting in the 15th century

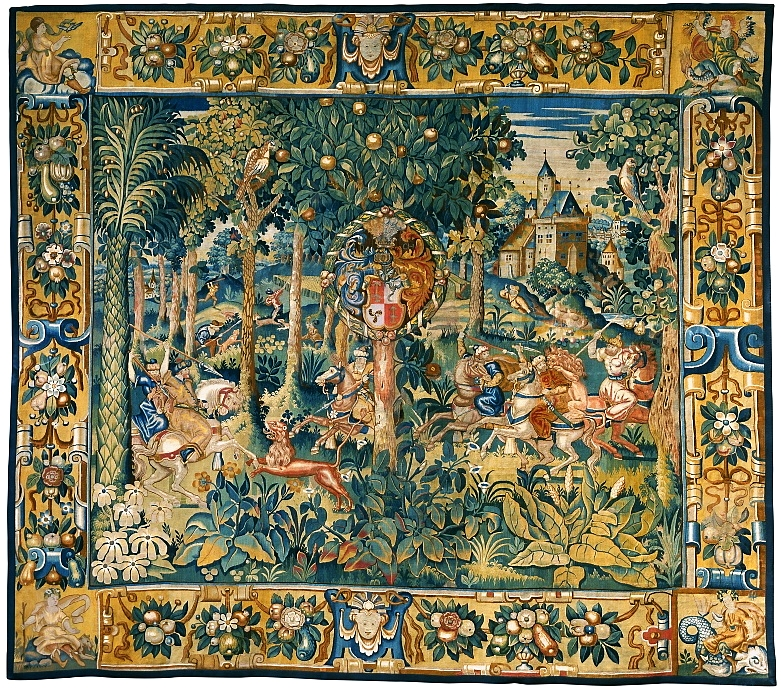
Tapestry with a hunting scene, late 16th century

From early Christian times, hunting has been forbidden to Roman Catholic Church clerics. The Corpus Juris Canonici (C. ii, X, De cleric. venat.) says, "We forbid to all servants of God hunting and expeditions through the woods with hounds; and we also forbid them to keep hawks or falcons." The Fourth Council of the Lateran, held under Pope Innocent III, decreed (canon xv): "We interdict hunting or hawking to all clerics." The decree of the Council of Trent is worded more mildly: "Let clerics abstain from illicit hunting and hawking" (Sess. XXIV, De reform., c. xii), which seems to imply that not all hunting is illicit, and canonists generally make a distinction declaring noisy (clamorosa) hunting unlawful, but not quiet (quieta) hunting.

Ferraris gives it as the general sense of canonists that hunting is allowed to clerics if it be indulged in rarely and for sufficient cause, as necessity, utility or "honest" recreation, and with that moderation which is becoming to the ecclesiastical state. However, the bishop Gregorius Thomas Ziegler thought that the interpretation of the canonists was not in accordance with the letter or spirit of the laws of the church.

Nevertheless, although a distinction between lawful and unlawful hunting is permissible, a bishop can prohibit all hunting to the clerics of his diocese, as was done by synods at Milan, Avignon, Liège, Cologne, and elsewhere. Pope Benedict XIV declared that such synodal decrees were not too severe, as an absolute prohibition of hunting is more conformable to the ecclesiastical law. In practice, the synodal statutes of various localities must be consulted to discover whether they allow quiet hunting or prohibit it altogether. Small-scale hunting as a family or subsistence farming activity is recognised by Pope Francis in his encyclical letter, Laudato si', as a legitimate and valuable aspect of employment within the food production system.

Hunting is not forbidden in Jewish law, although there is an aversion to it. The great 18th-century authority Rabbi Yechezkel Landau after a study concluded that, although "hunting would not be considered cruelty to animals insofar as the animal is generally killed quickly and not tortured... There is an unseemly element in it, namely cruelty." The other issue is that hunting can be dangerous and Judaism places a significant emphasis on the value of human life.

Islamic Sharia Law permits hunting of lawful animals and birds if they cannot be easily caught and slaughtered. However, this is only for the purpose of food and not for trophy hunting.

== National traditions ==
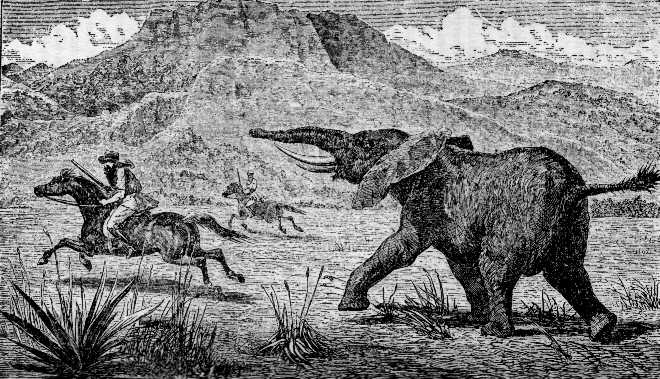
Explorer and big game hunter Samuel Baker chased by an elephant, illustration from 1890

=== East Africa ===
A safari, from a Swahili word meaning "journey, expedition," especially in Africa, is defined as a journey to see or kill animals in their natural environment, most commonly in East Africa. Safari as a distinctive way of hunting was popularized by the US author Ernest Hemingway and President Theodore Roosevelt. A safari may consist of a several-days or even weeks-long journey, with camping in the bush or jungle, while pursuing big game. Nowadays, it is often used to describe hunting tours through African wildlife.

Hunters are usually tourists, accompanied by licensed and highly regulated professional hunters, local guides, skinners, and porters in more difficult terrains. A special safari type is the solo-safari, where all the license acquiring, stalking, preparation, and outfitting is done by the hunter themself.

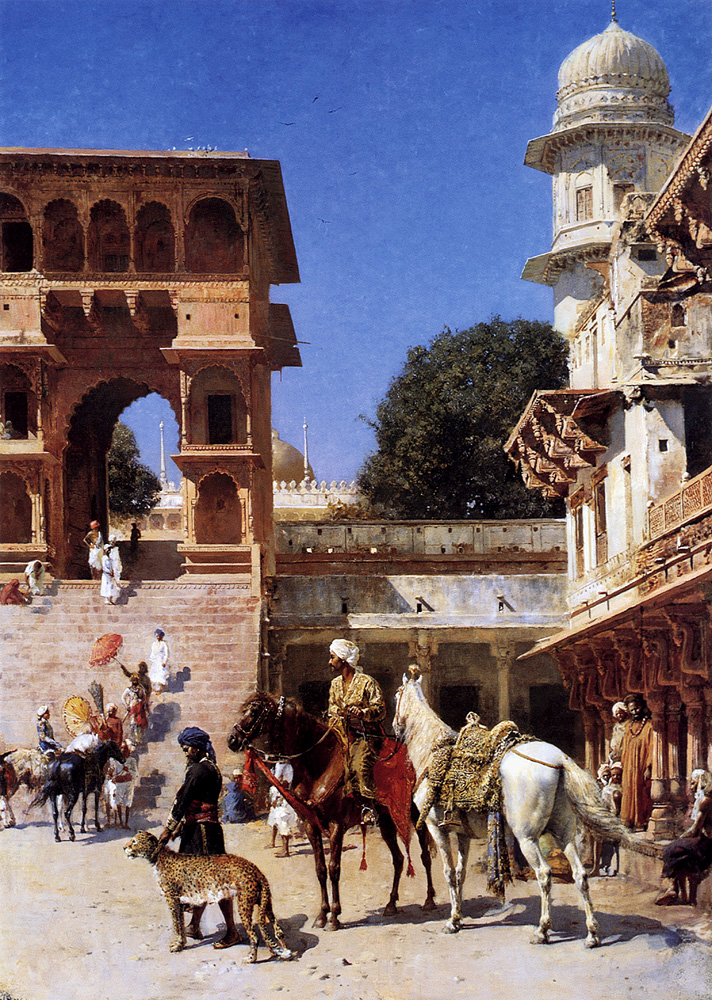
Weeks Edwin's painting Departure for the Hunt, c. 1885

=== Indian subcontinent ===
A Shikar party in Mandalay, Burma, soon after the conclusion of the Third Anglo-Burmese War in 1886, when Burma was annexed to British India

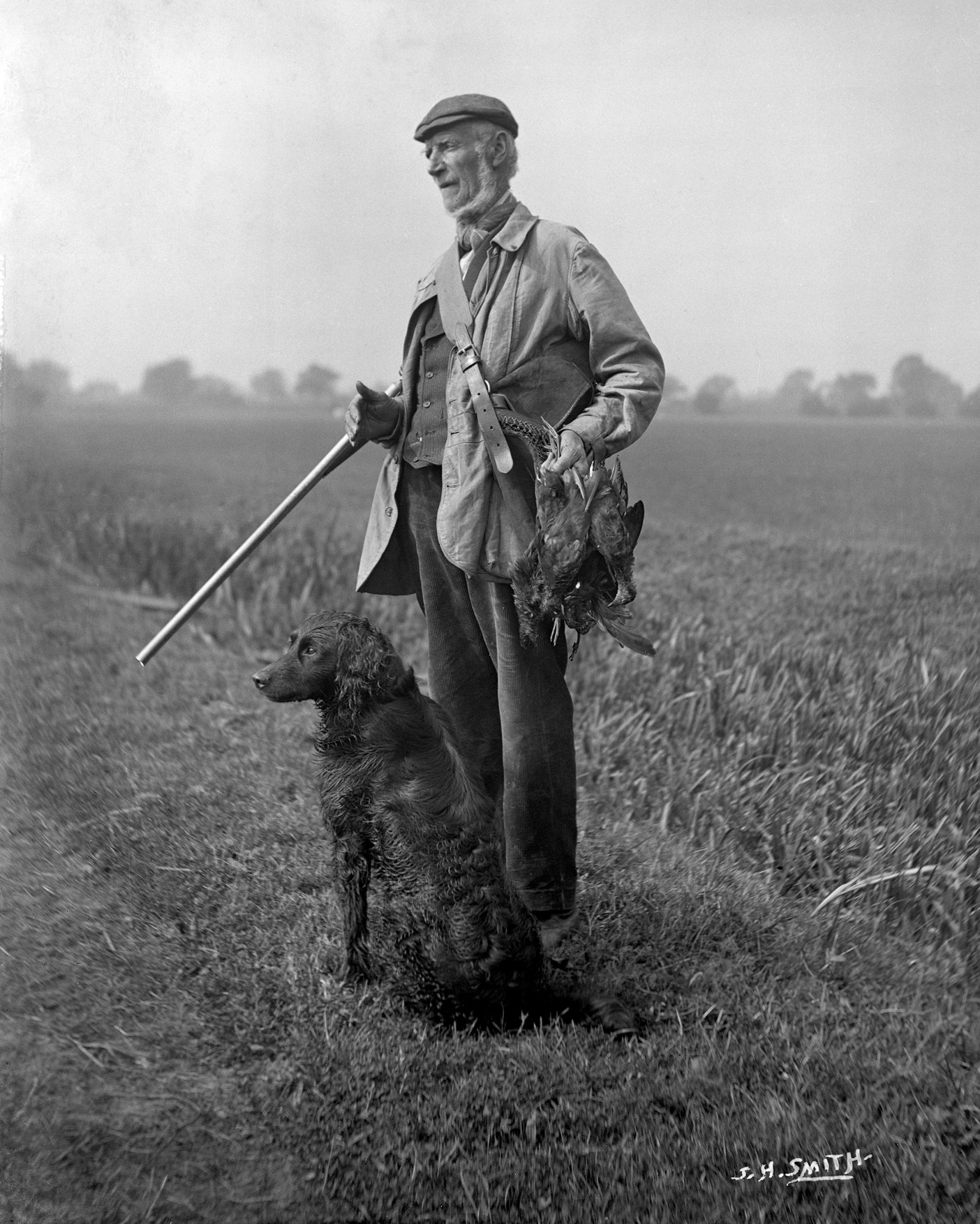
Snowden Slights with retriever and shotgun around 1910, "the last of Yorkshire's Wildfowlers"

During the feudal and colonial times in British India, hunting or shikar was regarded as a regal sport in the numerous princely states, as many maharajas and nawabs, as well as British officers, maintained a whole corps of shikaris (big-game hunters), who were native professional hunters. They would be headed by a master of the hunt, who might be styled mir-shikar. Often, they recruited the normally low-ranking local tribes because of their traditional knowledge of the environment and hunting techniques. Big game, such as Bengal tigers, might be hunted from the back of an Indian elephant.

Regional social norms are generally antagonistic to hunting, while a few sects, such as the Bishnoi, lay special emphasis on the conservation of particular species, such as the antelope. India's Wildlife Protection Act of 1972 bans the killing of all wild animals. However, the Chief Wildlife Warden may, if satisfied that any wild animal from a specified list has become dangerous to human life or is so disabled or diseased as to be beyond recovery, permit any person to hunt such an animal. In this case, the body of any wild animal killed or wounded becomes government property.

The practice among the soldiers in British India during the 1770s of going out to hunt snipes—a shorebird considered extremely challenging for hunters due to its alertness, camouflaging colour and erratic flight behavior—is believed to be the origin of the modern word for sniper, as snipe-hunters needed to be stealthy in addition to having tracking skills and marksmanship. The term was used in the nineteenth century, and had become common usage by the First World War.

=== United Kingdom ===
Unarmed fox hunting on horseback with hounds is the type of hunting most closely associated with the United Kingdom; in fact, "hunting" without qualification implies fox hunting. What in other countries is called "hunting" is called "shooting" (birds) or "stalking" (deer) in Britain. Fox hunting is a social activity for the upper classes, with roles strictly defined by wealth and status. Similar to fox hunting in many ways is the chasing of hares with hounds. Pairs of sighthounds (or long-dogs), such as greyhounds, may be used to pursue a hare in coursing, where the greyhounds are marked as to their skill in coursing the hare (but are not intended to actually catch it), or the hare may be pursued with scent hounds such as beagles or harriers. Other sorts of foxhounds may also be used for hunting stags (deer) or mink. Deer stalking with rifles is carried out on foot without hounds, using stealth.

These forms of hunting have been controversial in the UK; animal welfare supporters argue that hunting causes unnecessary suffering to foxes, horses, and hounds, while proponents argue that the activity is a historical tradition. Using dogs to chase wild mammals was made illegal in February 2005 by the Hunting Act 2004; there were a number of exemptions (under which the activity may not be illegal) in the act for hunting with hounds, but no exemptions at all for hare-coursing.

==== Shooting traditions ====
Game birds, especially pheasants and red grouse, are shot with shotguns for sport in the UK; the British Association for Shooting and Conservation says that over a million people per year participate in shooting, including game shooting, clay pigeon shooting, and target shooting. Shooting as practiced in Britain, as opposed to traditional hunting, requires little questing for game—around thirty-five million birds are released onto shooting estates every year, some having been factory farmed. Shoots can be elaborate affairs, with guns placed in assigned positions and assistants to help load shotguns. When in position, "beaters" move through the areas of cover, swinging sticks or flags to drive the game out. Such events are often called "drives," "driven hunting," or "driven hunts" (e.g., driven grouse shooting). The open season for grouse in the UK begins on 12 August, the so-called Glorious Twelfth. The definition of game in the United Kingdom is governed by the Game Act 1831 (1 & 2 Will. 4. c. 32).

A similar tradition, ojeo, exists in Spain.

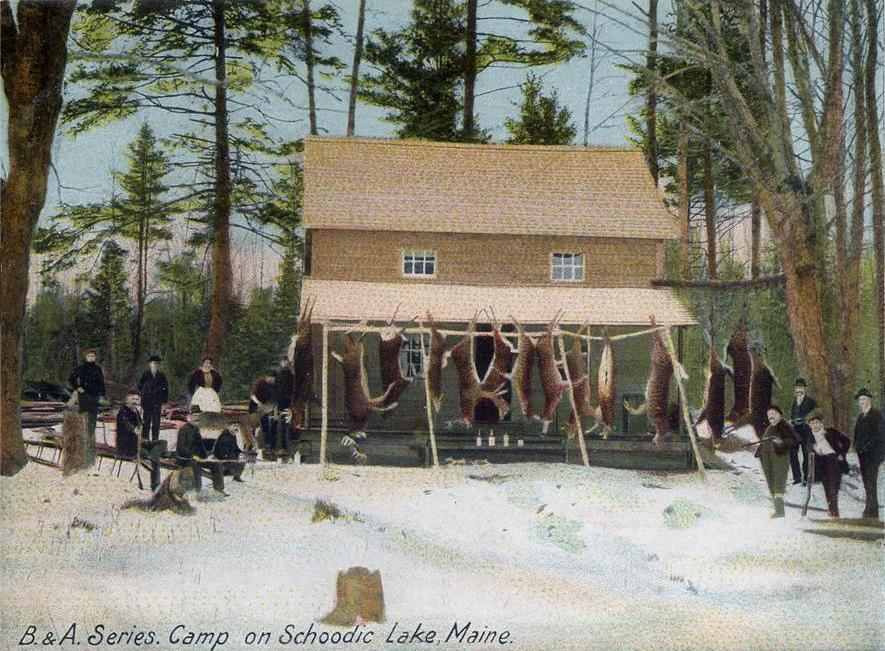
Hunting camp with dressed deer at Schoodic Lake, Maine, in 1905

=== United States ===
North American hunting pre-dates the United States by thousands of years and was an important part of many pre-Columbian, Native American cultures. Native Americans retain some hunting rights and are exempt from some laws as part of Indian treaties and otherwise under federal law:examples include eagle feather laws and exemptions in the Marine Mammal Protection Act. This is considered particularly important in Alaskan Native communities.

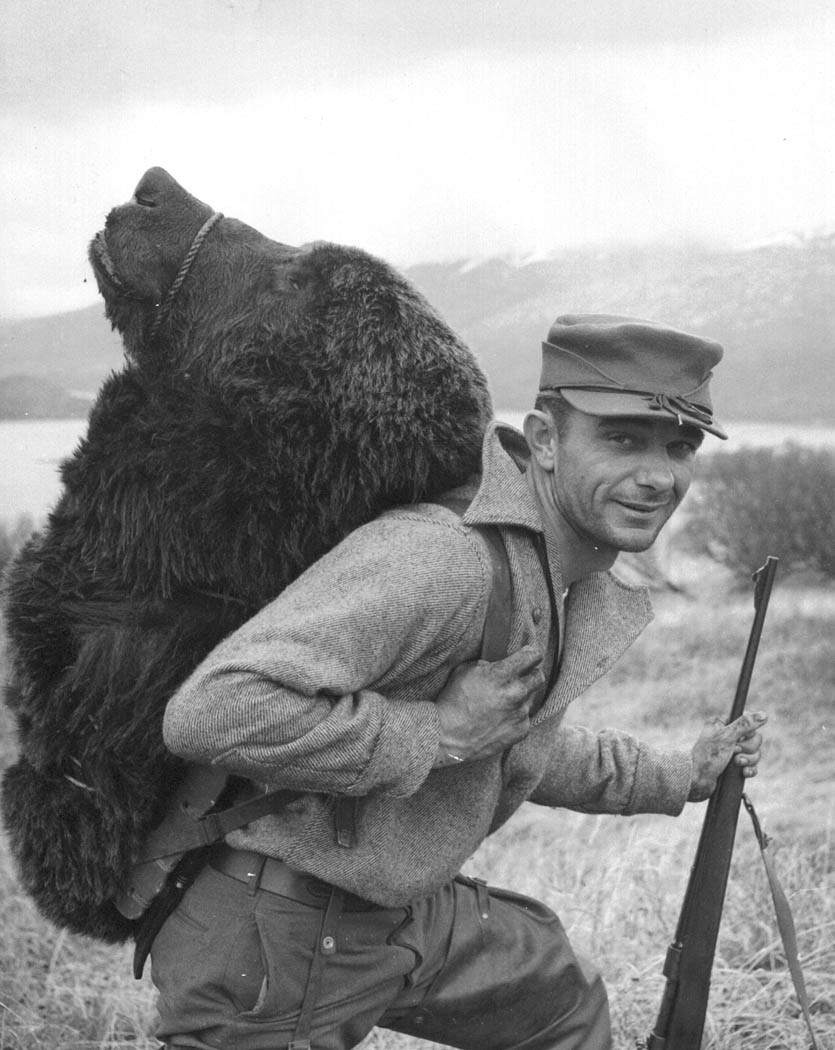
A hunter carrying a bear trophy head at the Kodiak Archipelago, circa 1957

Gun usage in hunting is typically regulated by game category, area within the state, and time period. Regulations for big-game hunting often specify a minimum caliber or muzzle energy for firearms. The use of rifles is often banned for safety reasons in areas with high population densities or limited topographic relief. Regulations may also limit or ban the use of lead in ammunition because of environmental concerns. Specific seasons for bow hunting or muzzle-loading black-powder guns are often established to limit competition with hunters using more effective weapons.

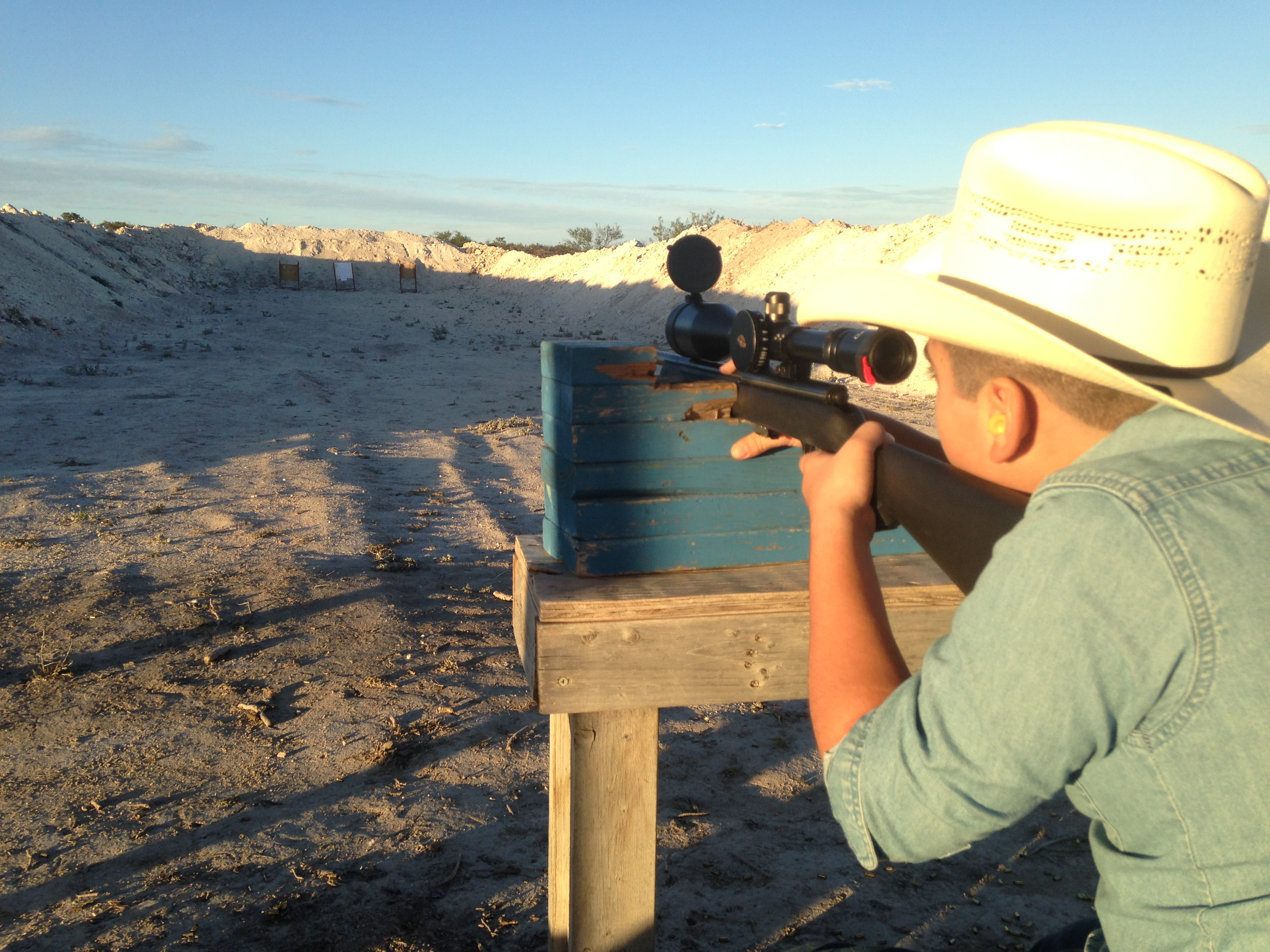
A man doing target practice for the hunting season

Hunting in the United States is not associated with any particular class or culture; a 2006 poll showed seventy-eight per cent of Americans supported legal hunting, although relatively few Americans actually hunt. At the beginning of the 21st century, just six per cent of Americans hunted. Southerners in states along the eastern seaboard hunted at a rate of five per cent, slightly below the national average, and while hunting was more common in other parts of the South at nine per cent, these rates did not surpass those of the Plains states, where twelve per cent of Midwesterners hunted. Hunting in other areas of the country fell below the national average. Overall, in the 1996–2006 period, the number of hunters over the age of sixteen declined by ten per cent, a drop attributable to a number of factors, including habitat loss and changes in recreation habits.

The principles of the fair chase have been a part of the American hunting tradition for over one hundred years. The role of the hunter-conservationist, popularised by Theodore Roosevelt, and perpetuated by Roosevelt's formation of the Boone and Crockett Club, has been central to the development of the modern fair chase tradition. A book by Jim Posewitz, Beyond Fair Chase: The Ethic and Tradition of Hunting, describes fair chase:

"Fundamental to ethical hunting is the idea of fair chase. This concept addresses the balance between the hunter and the hunted. It is a balance that allows hunters to occasionally succeed while animals generally avoid being taken."

When Internet hunting was introduced in 2005, allowing people to hunt over the Internet using remotely controlled guns, the practice was widely criticised by hunters as violating the principles of fair chase. As a representative of the National Rifle Association of America (NRA) explained:

"The NRA has always maintained that fair chase, being in the field with your firearm or bow, is an important element of hunting tradition. Sitting at your desk in front of your computer, clicking at a mouse, has nothing to do with hunting."

Animals such as blackbuck, nilgai, axis deer, fallow deer, zebras, barasingha, gazelle, and many other exotic game species can now be found on game farms and ranches in the state of Texas, where they were introduced for sport hunting. Hunters can be found paying in excess of $10,000 to take trophy animals on these controlled ranches.

=== Russia ===
The Russian imperial hunts evolved from hunting traditions of early Russian rulers—Grand Princes and Tsars—under the influence of hunting customs of European royal courts. The imperial hunts were organised mainly in Peterhof, Tsarskoye Selo, and Gatchina.

=== Australia ===
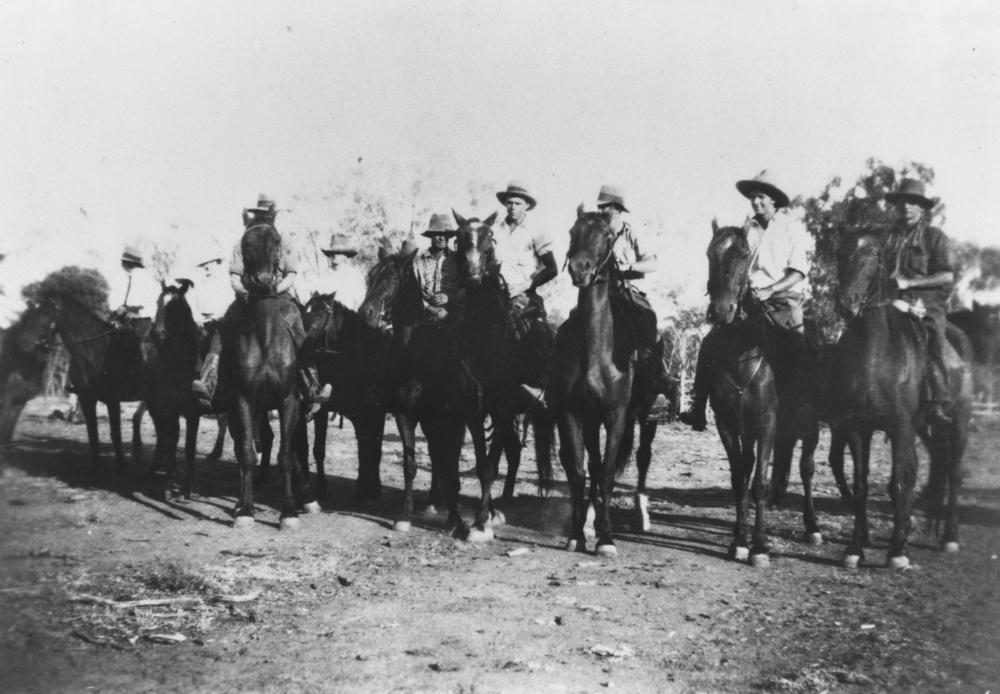
Riders gather for a dingo drive in Morven, Queensland, 1936

Hunting in Australia has evolved around the hunting and eradication of various animals considered to be pests or invasive species. All native animals are protected by law, and certain species such as kangaroos and ducks can be hunted by licensed shooters but only under a special permit on public lands during open seasons. The introduced species that are targeted include European rabbits, red foxes, deer (sambar, hog, red, fallow, chital and rusa), feral cats, pigs, goats, brumbies, donkeys and occasionally camels, as well as introduced upland birds such as quails, pheasants and partridges.

=== New Zealand ===
New Zealand has a strong hunting culture. When humans arrived on the islands that make up New Zealand, the only mammals present were bats, although seals and other marine mammals were present along the coasts. However, when humans arrived they brought other species with them. Polynesian voyagers introduced kuri (dogs), kiore (Polynesian rats), as well as a range of plant species. European explorers further added to New Zealand's biota, particularly pigs which were introduced by either Captain Cook or the French explorer De Surville in the 1700s.

During the nineteenth century, as European colonisation took place, acclimatisation societies were established. The societies introduced a large number of species with no use other than as prey for hunting. Species that adapted well to the New Zealand terrain include deer, pigs, goats, hare, tahr and chamois. With wilderness areas, suitable forage, and no natural predators, their populations exploded. Government agencies view the animals as pests due to their effects on the natural environment and on agricultural production, but hunters view them as a resource.

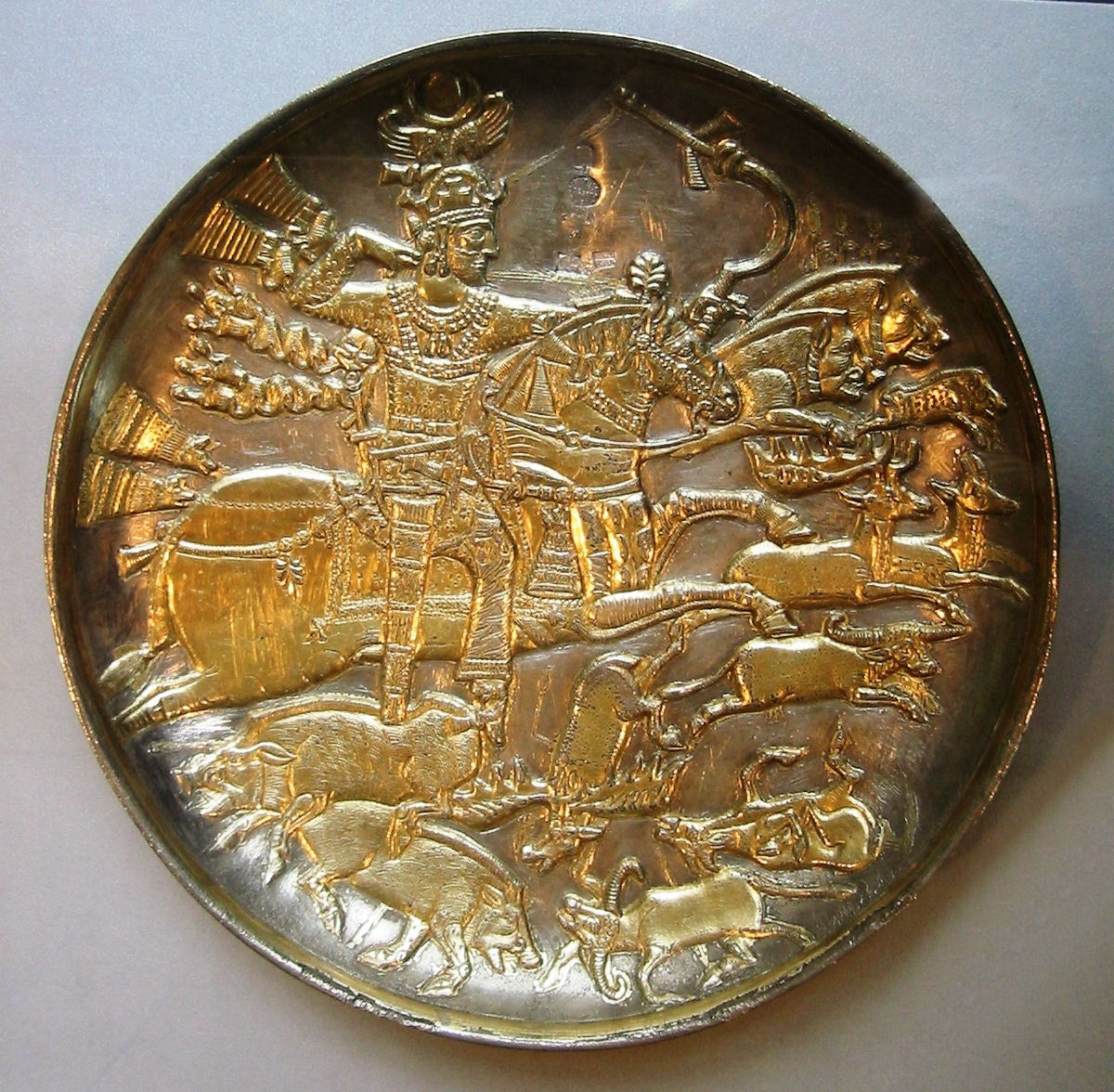
Plate depicting Khosrow I hunting animals

=== Iran ===
Iranian tradition regarded hunting as an essential part of a prince's education, and hunting was well recorded for the education of the upper-class youths during pre-Islamic Persia. As of October 2020, a hunting licensee costs $20,000; although, the Department of Environment does not report the number of permits issued.

=== Japan ===
The numbers of licensed hunters in Japan, including those using snares and guns, is generally decreasing, while their average age is increasing. As of 2010, there were approximately 190,000 registered hunters, approximately 65% of whom were sixty years old or older.

=== Trinidad and Tobago ===
There is a very active tradition of hunting small to medium-sized wild game in Trinidad and Tobago. Hunting is carried out with firearms, slingshots and cage traps, and sometimes aided by the use of hounds. The illegal use of trap guns and snare nets also occurs. With approximately 12,000 to 13,000 hunters applying for and being granted hunting permits in recent years, there is some concern that the practice might not be sustainable. In addition, there are at present no bag limits, and the open season is comparatively very long (5 months—October to February inclusive). As such, hunting pressure from legal hunters is very high.

In addition, there is a thriving and very lucrative black market for poached wild game (sold and purchased as expensive luxury delicacies), and the numbers of commercial poachers in operation is unknown but presumed to be fairly high. As a result, the populations of the five major mammalian game species (red-rumped agouti, lowland paca, nine-banded armadillo, collared peccary and red brocket deer) are thought to be relatively low when compared to less-hunted regions in nearby mainland South America (although scientifically conducted population studies are only just recently being conducted as of 2013). It appears that the red brocket deer population has been extirpated in Tobago as a result of over-hunting.

By some time in the mid 20th century, another extirpation due to over-hunting occurred in Trinidad with its population of horned screamer (a large game bird). Various herons, ducks, doves, the green iguana, the cryptic golden tegu, the spectacled caiman, the common opossum and the capybara are also commonly hunted and poached. There is also some poaching of "fully protected species", including the red howler monkey and capuchin monkeys, southern tamandua, Brazilian porcupine, yellow-footed tortoise, the critically endangered island–endemic Trinidad piping guan, and even one of the national birds, the scarlet ibis.

Legal hunters pay relatively small fees to obtain hunting licenses and undergo no official basic conservation biology or hunting-ethics/fair chase training, and are not assessed regarding their knowledge and comprehension of the local wildlife conservation laws. There is presumed to be relatively little subsistence hunting in the country (with most hunting for either sport or commercial profit). The local wildlife management authorities are under-staffed and under-funded, and as such, little in the way of enforcement is done to uphold existing wildlife management laws, with hunting/poaching occur both in and out of season and even in wildlife sanctuaries.

There is some indication that the government is beginning to take the issue of wildlife management more seriously, with legislation being brought before Parliament in 2015. It remains to be seen if the drafted legislation will be fully adopted and financially supported by the current and future governments, and if the general populace will move towards a greater awareness of the importance of wildlife conservation and change the culture of consumption to one of sustainable management.

== Wildlife management ==
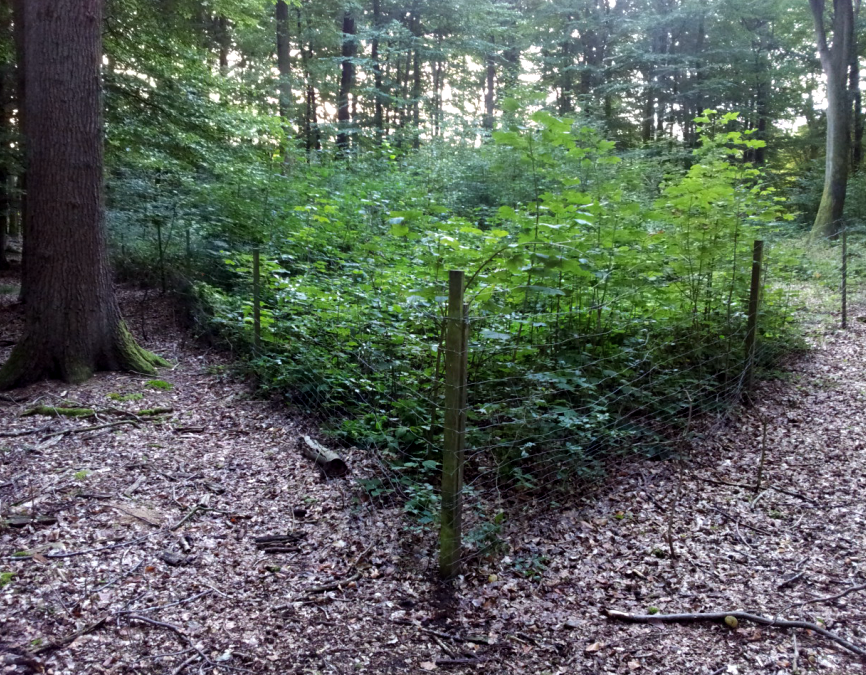
Control fence to assess the impact of browsing by ungulates. Note the lack of natural forest regeneration outside the fencing.

Hunting is claimed to give resource managers an important tool in managing populations that might exceed the carrying capacity of their habitat and threaten the well-being of other species, or, in some instances, damage human health or safety.

In some cases, hunting actually can increase the population of predators such as coyotes by removing territorial bounds that would otherwise be established, resulting in excess neighbouring migrations into an area, thus artificially increasing the population. Hunting advocates assert that hunting reduces intraspecific competition for food and shelter, reducing mortality among the remaining animals. Some environmentalists assert that (re)introducing predators would achieve the same end with greater efficiency and fewer negative effects, such as introducing significant amounts of free lead into the environment and food chain.

In the United States, wildlife managers are frequently part of hunting regulatory and licensing bodies, where they help to set rules on the number, manner, and conditions in which game may be hunted.

Management agencies sometimes rely on hunting to control specific animal populations, as has been the case with deer in North America. These hunts may sometimes be carried out by professional shooters, although others may include amateur hunters. Many US city and local governments hire professional and amateur hunters each year to reduce populations of animals such as deer that are becoming hazardous in a restricted area, such as neighbourhood parks and metropolitan open spaces.

A large part of managing populations involves managing the number and, sometimes, the size or age of animals harvested so as to ensure the sustainability of the population. Tools that are frequently used to control harvest are bag limits and season closures, although gear restrictions such as archery-only seasons are becoming increasingly popular in an effort to reduce hunter success rates in countries that rely on bag limits per hunter instead of per area.

== Laws ==
Illegal hunting and harvesting of wild species contrary to local and international conservation and wildlife management laws is called poaching. Game preservation is one of the tactics used to prevent poaching. Violations of hunting laws and regulations involving poaching are normally punishable by law; punishment can include confiscation of equipment, fines, or a prison sentence.

=== Right to hunt ===
The right to hunt—sometimes in combination with the right to fish—is protected implicitly, as a consequence of the right of ownership, or explicitly, as a right on its own, in a number of jurisdictions. For instance, as of 2019, a total of 22 US states explicitly recognize a subjective right to hunt in their constitutions.

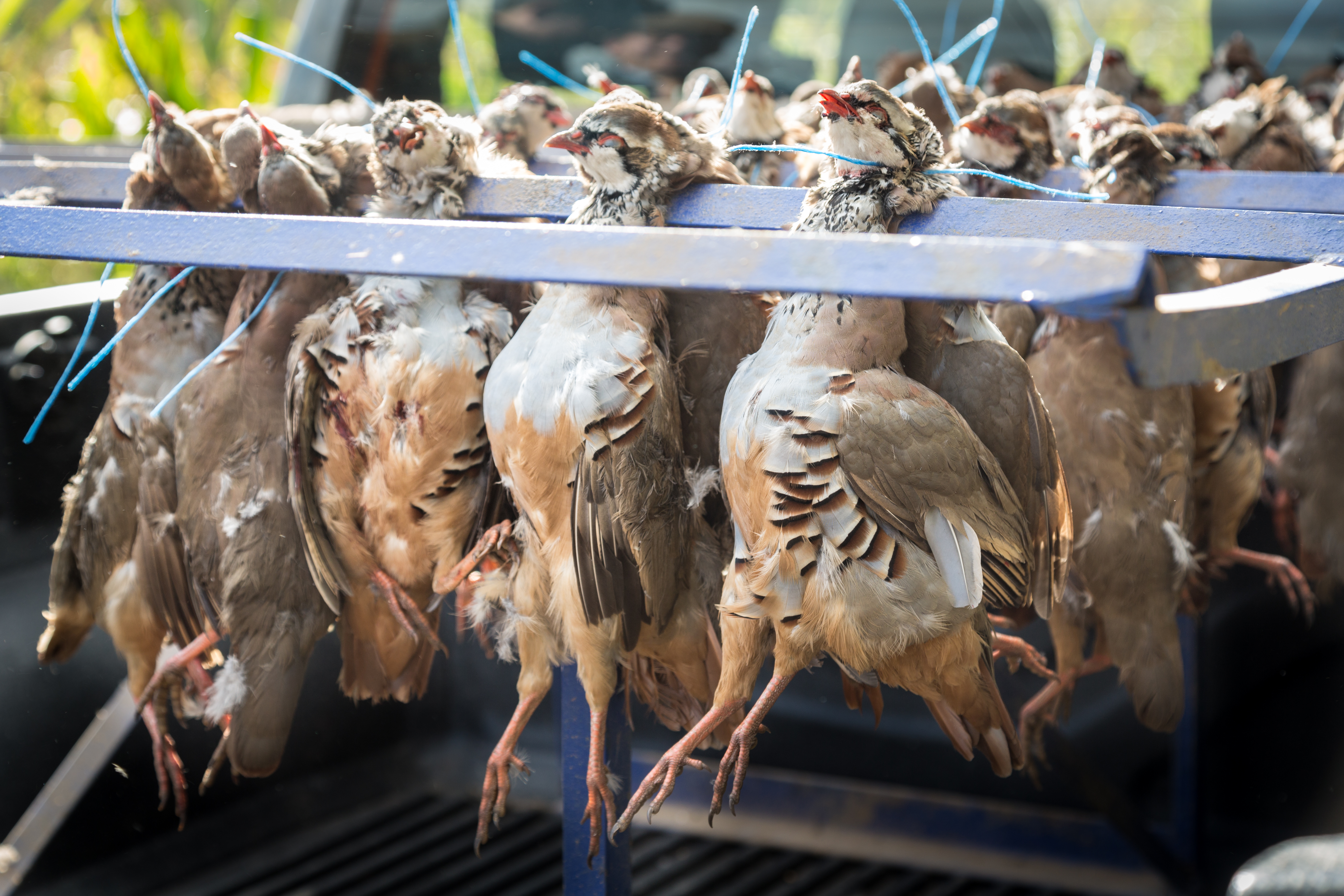
Red-legged partridges on a game rack

=== Bag limits ===
Bag limits are provisions under the law that control how many animals of a given species or group of species can be killed, although there are often species for which bag limits do not apply. There are also jurisdictions where bag limits are not applied at all or are not applied under certain circumstances. The phrase bag limits come from the custom among hunters of small game to carry successful kills in a small basket, similar to a fishing creel.

Where bag limits are used, there can be daily or seasonal bag limits; for example, ducks can often be harvested at a rate of six per hunter per day. Big game, such as moose, most often have a seasonal bag limit of one animal per hunter. Bag limits may also regulate the size, sex, or age of animal that a hunter can kill. In many cases, bag limits are designed to allocate harvest among the hunting population more equitably, rather than to protect animal populations, since protecting the population would necessitate regional density-dependent maximum bags.

=== Closed and open season ===
A closed season is a time of year during which hunting an animal of a given species is contrary to law. Typically, closed seasons are designed to protect a species when they are most vulnerable or to protect them during their breeding season. By extension, the period that is not the closed season is known as the open season.

== Methods ==
Historical, subsistence, and sport hunting techniques can differ radically, with modern hunting regulations often addressing issues of where, when, and how hunts are conducted. Techniques may vary depending on government regulations, a hunter's personal ethics, local custom, hunting equipment, and the animal being hunted. Often a hunter will use a combination of more than one technique. Laws may forbid sport hunters from using some methods used primarily in poaching and wildlife management.

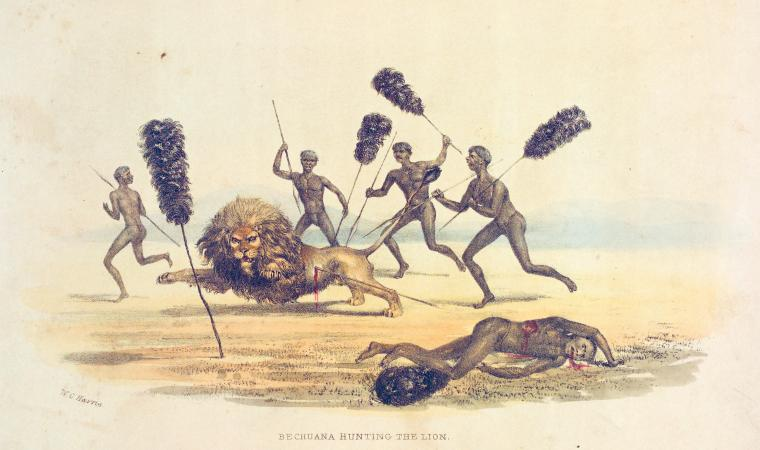
A group of Tswana people hunting a lion, 1841

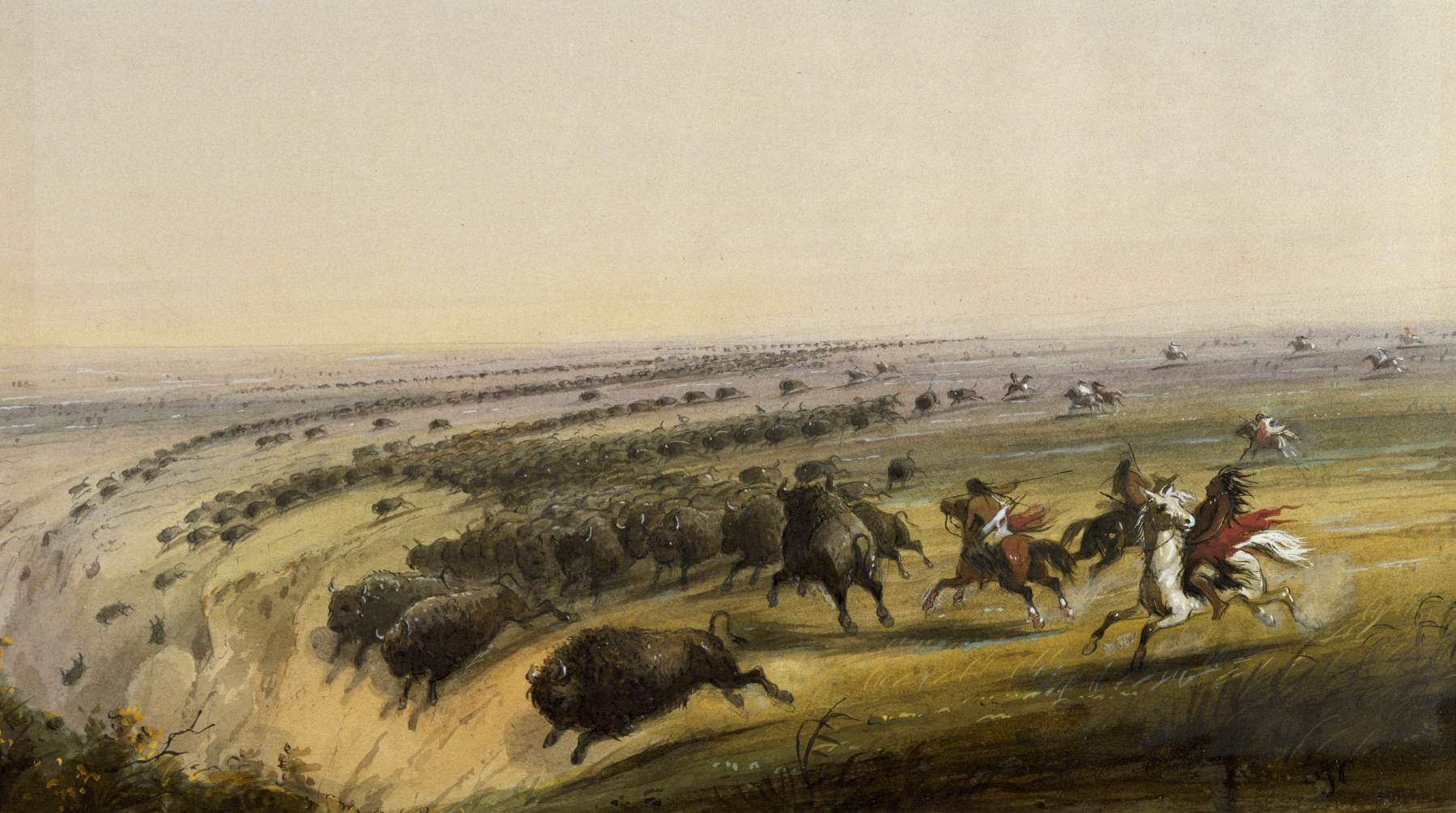
American bison being chased off a cliff, as seen and painted by Alfred Jacob Miller, c. 1860

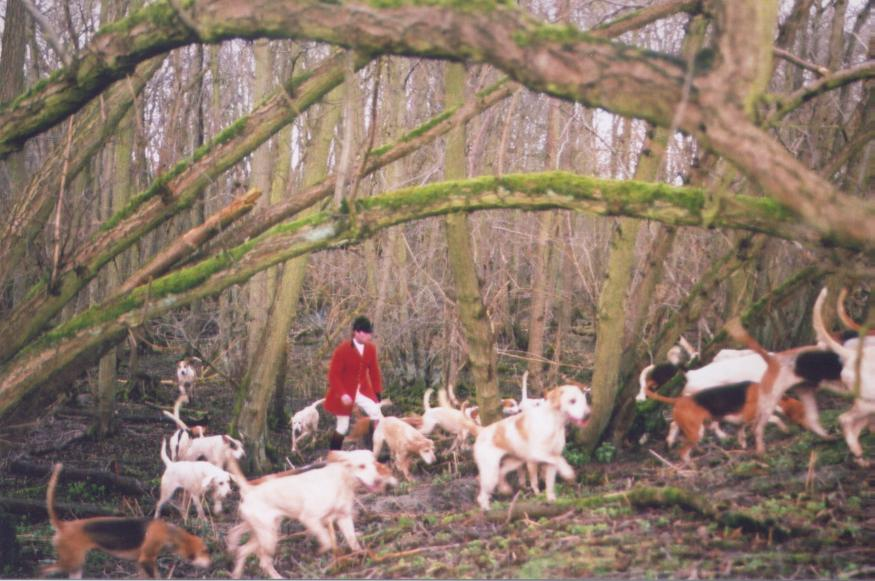
Master or whipper-in and fox hounds drawing a wood. Hunting in Yorkshire, Northern England, in 2005, on the last day of fully legal, proper, fox hunting.

== Statistics ==
=== Table ===
Number of hunters in various European and North American countries Sources: Europe (2016/17), Ireland (2007), Canada (2012), Russia (2012), United States (2016);
Country	Hunters	Population (millions)	Hunters as percentage of the total population	Relation hunters/inhabitants	Area (km^{2})	Hunters per km^{2}
Canada	2,482,678	34.7	7.15	1:14	9,984,670	0.25
Finland	308,000	5.2	5.92	1:17	338,448	0.91
Cyprus	45,000	0.8	5.63	1:18	5,896	7.63
Norway	190,000	4.7	4.04	1:25	385,207	0.49
Malta	15,000	0.4	3.75	1:27	316	47.47
United States	11,453,000	323.1	3.54	1:28	9,826,675	1.17
Sweden	290,000	9.0	3.22	1:31	447,435	0.65
Denmark	165,000	5.5	3.00	1:33	42,921	3.84
Ireland	104,000	4.2	2.48	1:46	70,273	1.48
Greece	235,000	10.7	2.20	1:46	131,957	1.78
Spain	980,000	45.0	2.18	1:46	505,970	1.94
Portugal	230,000	10.7	2.15	1:47	92,212	2.49
France	1,331,000	64.1	2.08	1:48	543,965	2.45
Russia	2,800,000	143.2	1.96	1:51	17,125,200	0.16
Bulgaria	110,000	7.7	1.43	1:70	110,994	0.99
Austria	118,000	8.3	1.42	1:70	83,879	1.41
United Kingdom	800,000	61.1	1.31	1:76	242,495	3.30
Italy	750,000	58.1	1.29	1:77	301,338	2.49
Estonia	16,600	1.3	1.28	1:78	45,339	0.37
Croatia	55,000	4.5	1.22	1:82	56,594	0.97
Slovenia	22,000	2.0	1.10	1:91	20,273	1.09
Latvia	25,000	2.3	1.09	1:92	64,589	0.39
Czech Republic	110,000	10.2	1.08	1:93	78,866	1.39
Slovakia	55,000	5.4	1.02	1:98	49,034	1.12
Lithuania	32,000	3.6	0.89	1:113	65,300	0.49
Hungary	55,000	9.9	0.56	1:180	93,036	0.59
Germany	351,000	82.5	0.43	1:235	357,578	0.98
Luxembourg	2,000	0.5	0.40	1:250	2,586	0.77
Switzerland	30,000	7.6	0.39	1:253	41,285	0.73
Poland	106,000	38.5	0.28	1:363	312,696	0.34
Romania	60,000	22.2	0.27	1:370	238,391	0.25
Belgium	23,000	10.4	0.22	1:452	30,688	0.75
Netherlands	28,170	16.7	0.17	1:593	41,543	0.68

== Trophy hunting ==
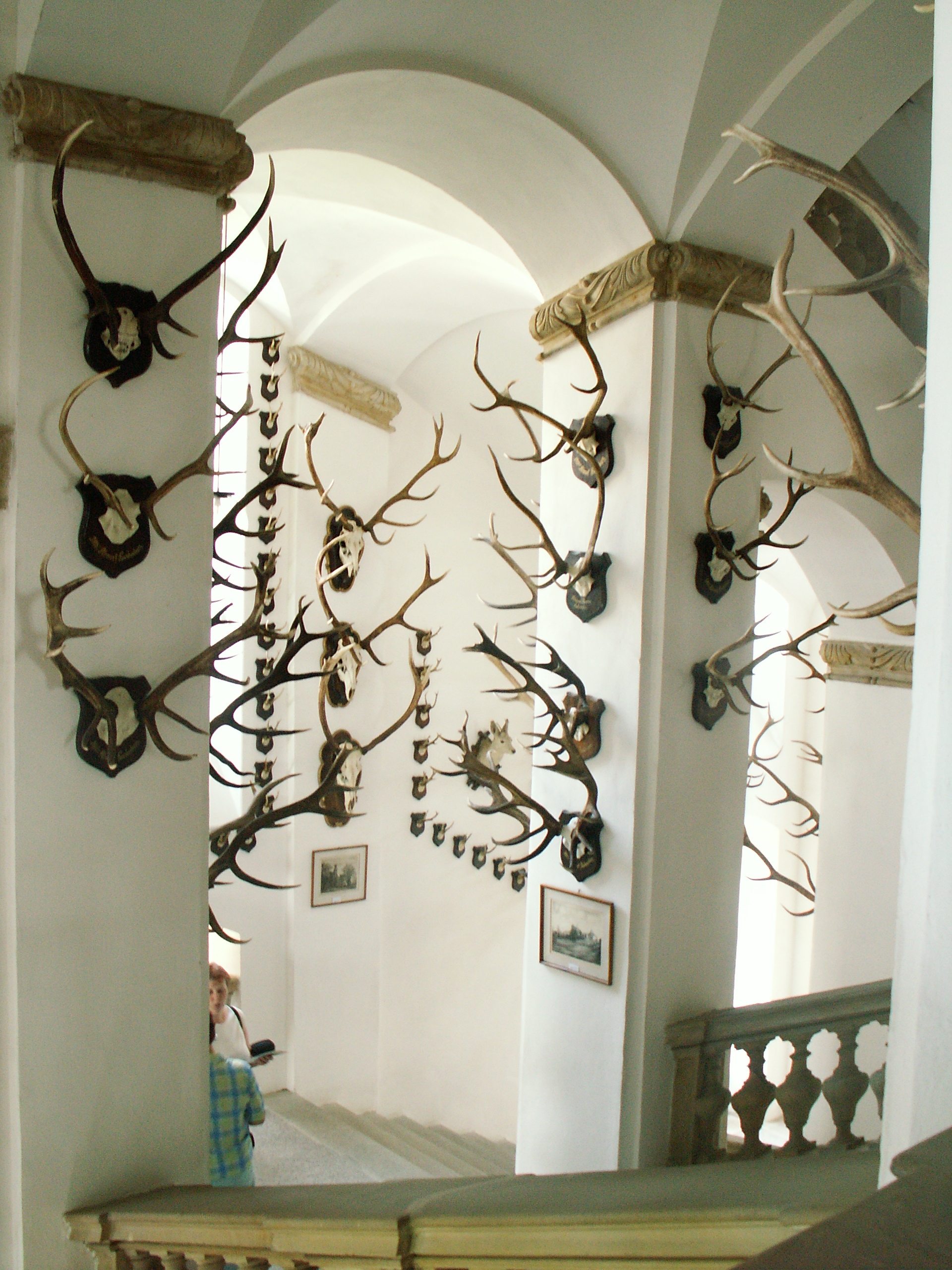
Trophy collection of the Liechtenstein family at Úsov Castle, the Czech Republic

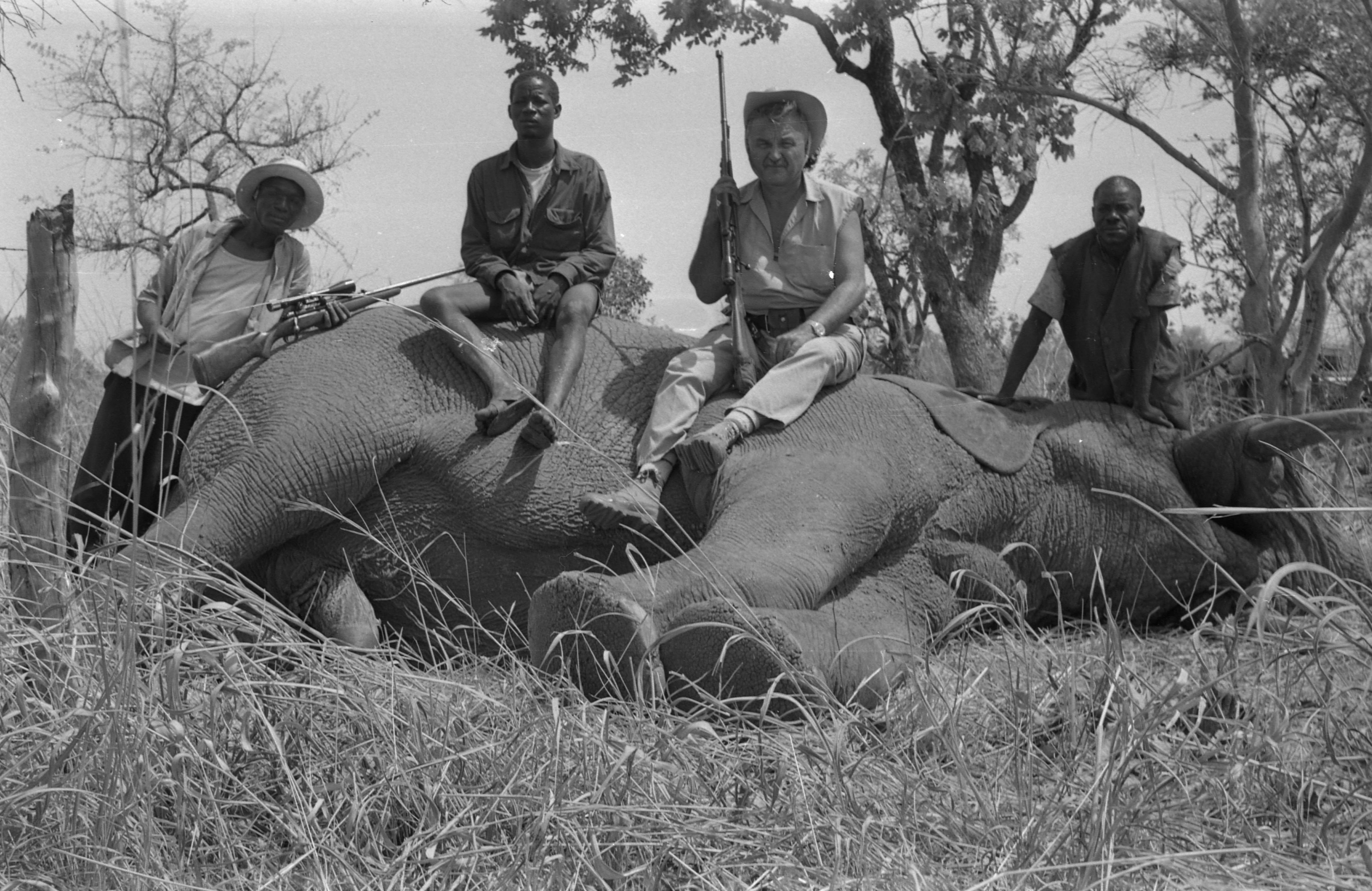
A hunter and local guides with an elephant they shot, 1970

Trophy hunting is the selective seeking and killing of wild game animals to take trophies for personal collection, bragging rights or as a status symbol. It may also include the controversial hunting of captive or semi-captive animals expressly bred and raised under controlled or semi-controlled conditions so as to attain trophy characteristics; this is sometimes known as canned hunts.

=== History ===
In the 19th century, southern and central European sport hunters often pursued game only for a trophy, usually the head or pelt of an animal, which was then displayed as a sign of prowess. The rest of the animal was typically discarded. Some cultures, however, disapprove of such waste. In Nordic countries, hunting for trophies was—and still is—frowned upon. Hunting in North America in the 19th century was done primarily as a way to supplement food supplies, although it is now undertaken mainly for sport. The safari method of hunting was a development of sport hunting that saw elaborate travel in Africa, India, and other places in pursuit of trophies. In modern times, trophy hunting persists and is a significant industry in some areas.

=== Conservation tool ===
According to the US Fish and Wildlife Service, hunting "provides an economic incentive" for ranchers to continue to breed those species, and that hunting "reduces the threat of the species' extinction."

A scientific study in the journal, Biological Conservation, states that trophy hunting is of "major importance to conservation in Africa by creating economic incentives for conservation over vast areas, including areas which may be unsuitable for alternative wildlife-based land uses such as photographic ecotourism." However, another study found that less than 3% of a trophy hunters' expenditures reach the local level, meaning that the economic incentive and benefit is "minimal, particularly when we consider the vast areas of land that hunting concessions occupy."

Financial incentives from trophy hunting effectively more than double the land area that is used for wildlife conservation, relative to what would be conserved relying on national parks alone, according to Biological Conservation, although local communities usually derive no more than 18 cents per hectare from trophy hunting.

Trophy hunting has been considered essential for providing economic incentives to conserve large carnivores, according to research studies in Conservation Biology, Journal of Sustainable Tourism, Wildlife Conservation by Sustainable Use, and Animal Conservation. Studies by the Centre for Responsible Tourism and the International Union for Conservation of Nature (IUCN) state that ecotourism, which includes more than hunting, is a superior economic incentive, generating twice the revenue per acre and 39 times more permanent employment. At the cross-section of trophy hunting, ecotourism, and conservation is green hunting, a trophy hunting alternative where hunters pay to dart animals that need to be tranquilized for conservation projects.

In 2016, the US House Committee on Natural Resources concluded that trophy hunting may be contributing to the extinction of certain animals. Animal welfare organizations, including the International Fund for Animal Welfare, claim that trophy hunting is a key factor in the "silent extinction" of giraffes.

According to a national survey conducted by the US Fish and Wildlife Service every five years, fewer people are hunting even as population rises. According to a graph of statistics from 2016 reported by National Public Radio (NPR), only about 5 per cent of Americans aged 16 years old and older hunt, which is half of what it was 50 years ago. The decline in the popularity of hunting is expected to accelerate over the next decade, which may threaten how the US pays for conservation, according to NPR.

=== Controversy ===
Trophy hunting is most often criticised when it involves rare or endangered animals. Critics may also see trophy hunting as an issue of morality or animal cruelty, criticising the killing of living creatures for recreation. Victorian era dramatist W. S. Gilbert remarked, "Deer-stalking would be a very fine sport if only the deer had guns."

There is also debate about the extent to which trophy hunting benefits the local economy. Hunters pay substantial fees to the game outfitters and hunting guides which contributes to the local economy and provides value to animals that would otherwise be seen as competition for grazing, livestock, and crops. However, the argument is disputed by animal welfare organizations and other opponents of trophy hunting. It is argued that the animals are worth more to the community for ecotourism than hunting.

== Economics ==
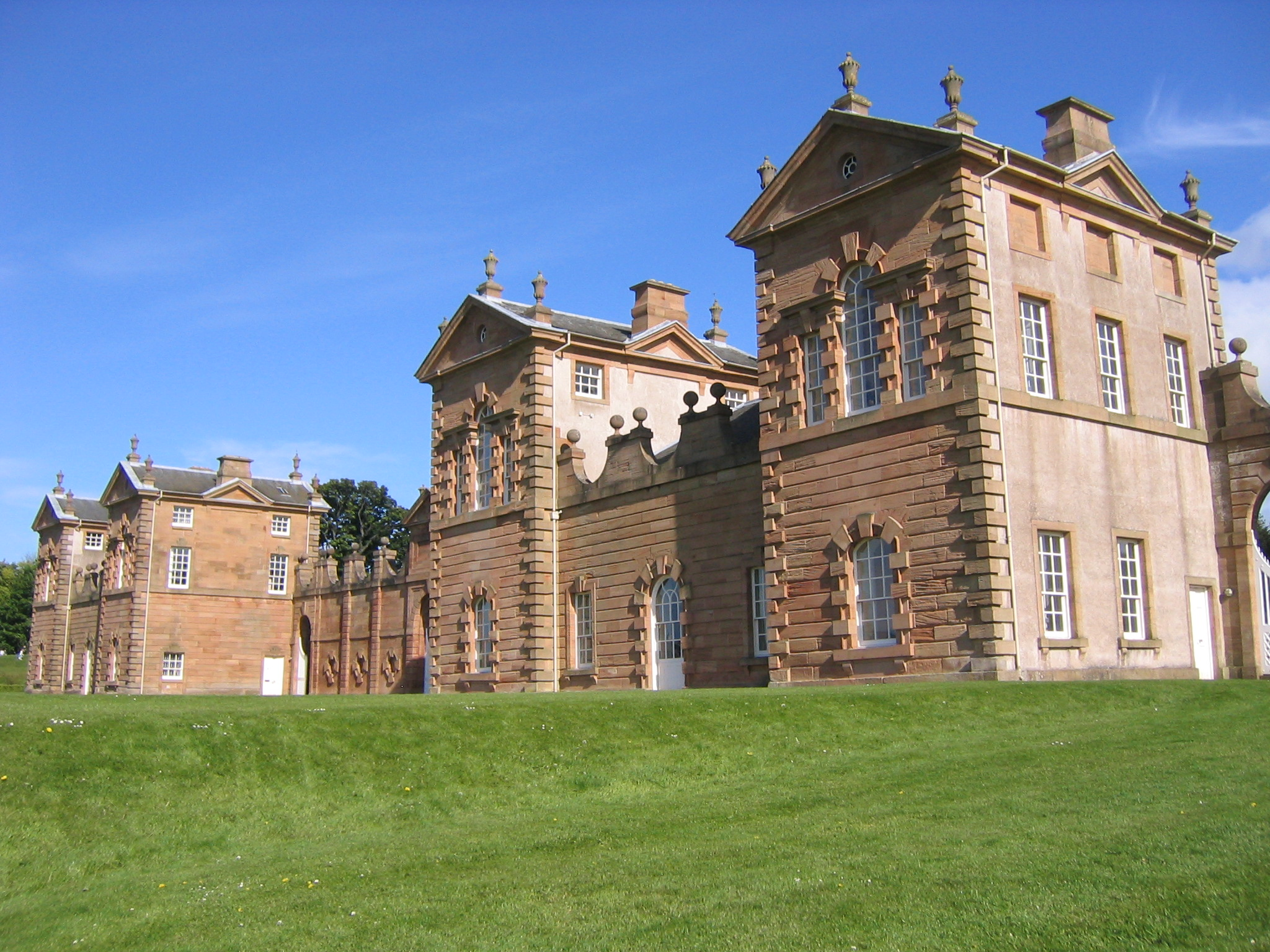
Chatelherault, built by William Adam in 1743 as the Duke of Hamilton's hunting lodge

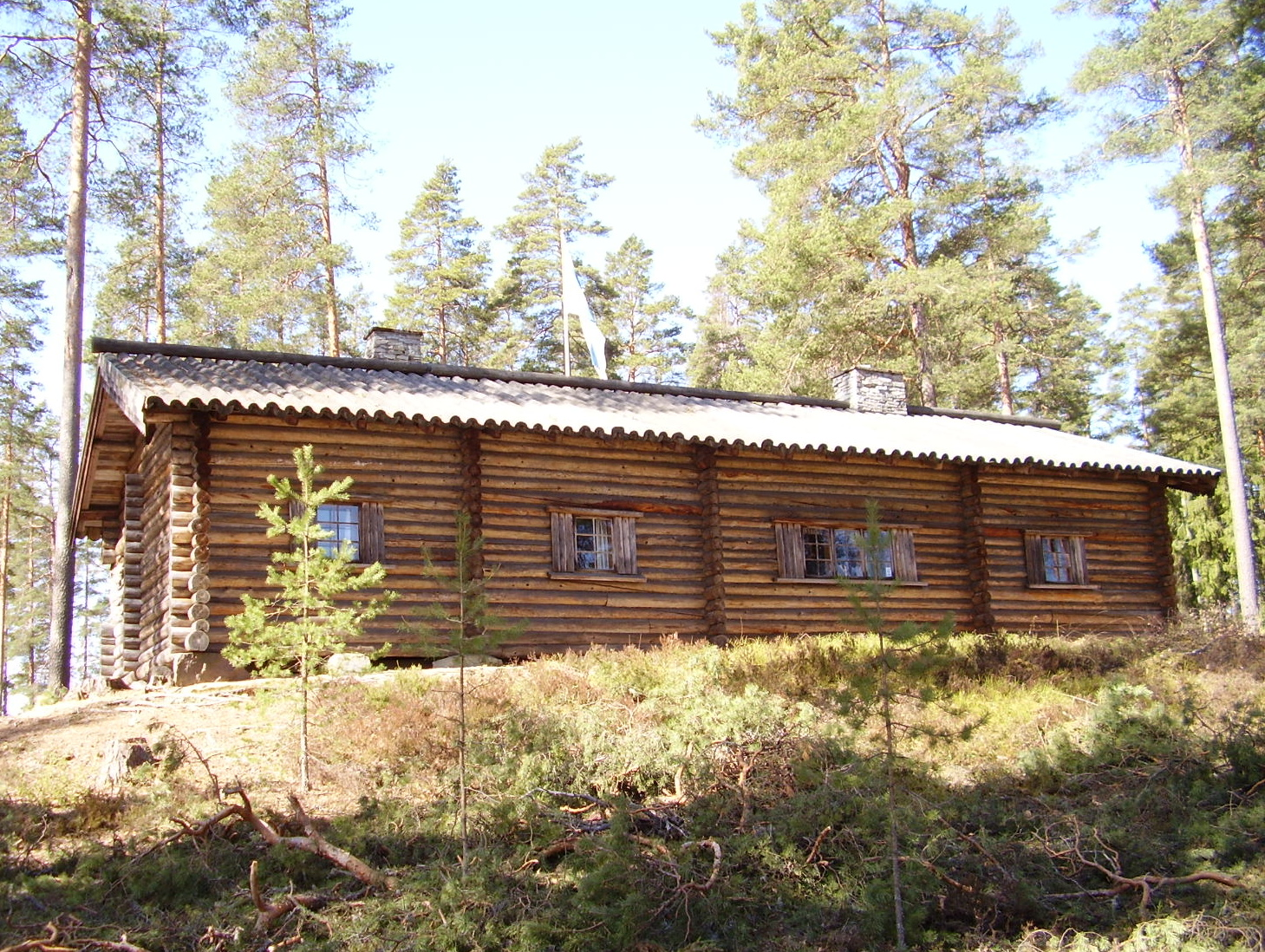
Marshal's Cabin, a former hunting lodge in Loppi, Finland, built c. 1942

A variety of industries benefit from hunting and support hunting on economic grounds. In Tanzania, it is estimated that a safari hunter spends fifty to one hundred times that of the average ecotourist. While the average photo tourist may seek luxury accommodation, the average safari hunter generally stays in tented camps. Safari hunters are also more likely to use remote areas that would be uninviting to the typical ecotourist. Advocates argue that these hunters allow for anti-poaching activities and revenue for local communities.

In the United Kingdom, the game hunting of birds as an industry is said to be extremely important to the rural economy. The Cobham Report of 1997 suggested it to be worth around £700 million, and hunting and shooting lobby groups claimed it to be worth over a billion pounds less than ten years later.

Hunting also has a significant financial impact in the United States, with many companies specialising in hunting equipment or speciality tourism. Many different technologies have been created to assist hunters. Today's hunters come from a broad range of economic, social, and cultural backgrounds. In 2001, over thirteen million hunters averaged eighteen days hunting, and spent over $20.5 billion on their sport. In the US, proceeds from hunting licenses contribute to state game management programs, including preservation of wildlife habitat.

Hunting contributes to a portion of caloric intake of people and may have positive impacts on greenhouse gas emissions by avoidance of utilization of meat raised under industrial methods.

== Environmental problems ==
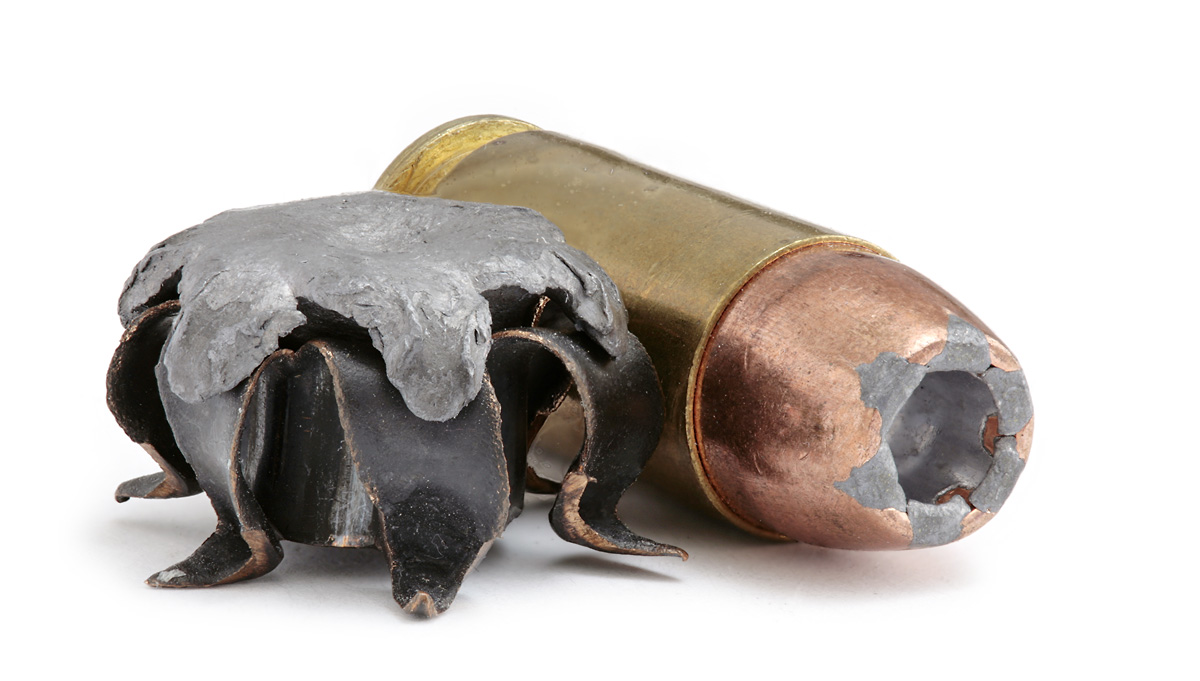
Right: .40 S&W round with hollow-point bullet Left: Expanded bullet of the same calibre with exposed lead core

Lead bullets that miss their target or remain in an un-retrieved carcass could become a toxicant in the environment, but lead in ammunition because of its metallic form has a lower solubility and higher resistance to corrosion than other forms of lead, making it hardly available to biological systems. Waterfowl or other birds may ingest the lead and poison themselves with the neurotoxicant, but studies have demonstrated that effects of lead in ammunition are negligible on animal population size and growth. Since 1991, US federal law forbids lead shot in waterfowl hunts, and 30 states have some type of restriction.

In December 2014, a federal appeals court denied a lawsuit by environmental groups that the Environmental Protection Agency (EPA) must use the Toxic Substances Control Act to regulate lead in shells and cartridges. The groups sought regulation from the EPA on "spent lead", yet the court found EPA could not regulate spent lead without also regulating cartridges and shells.

== Conservation ==
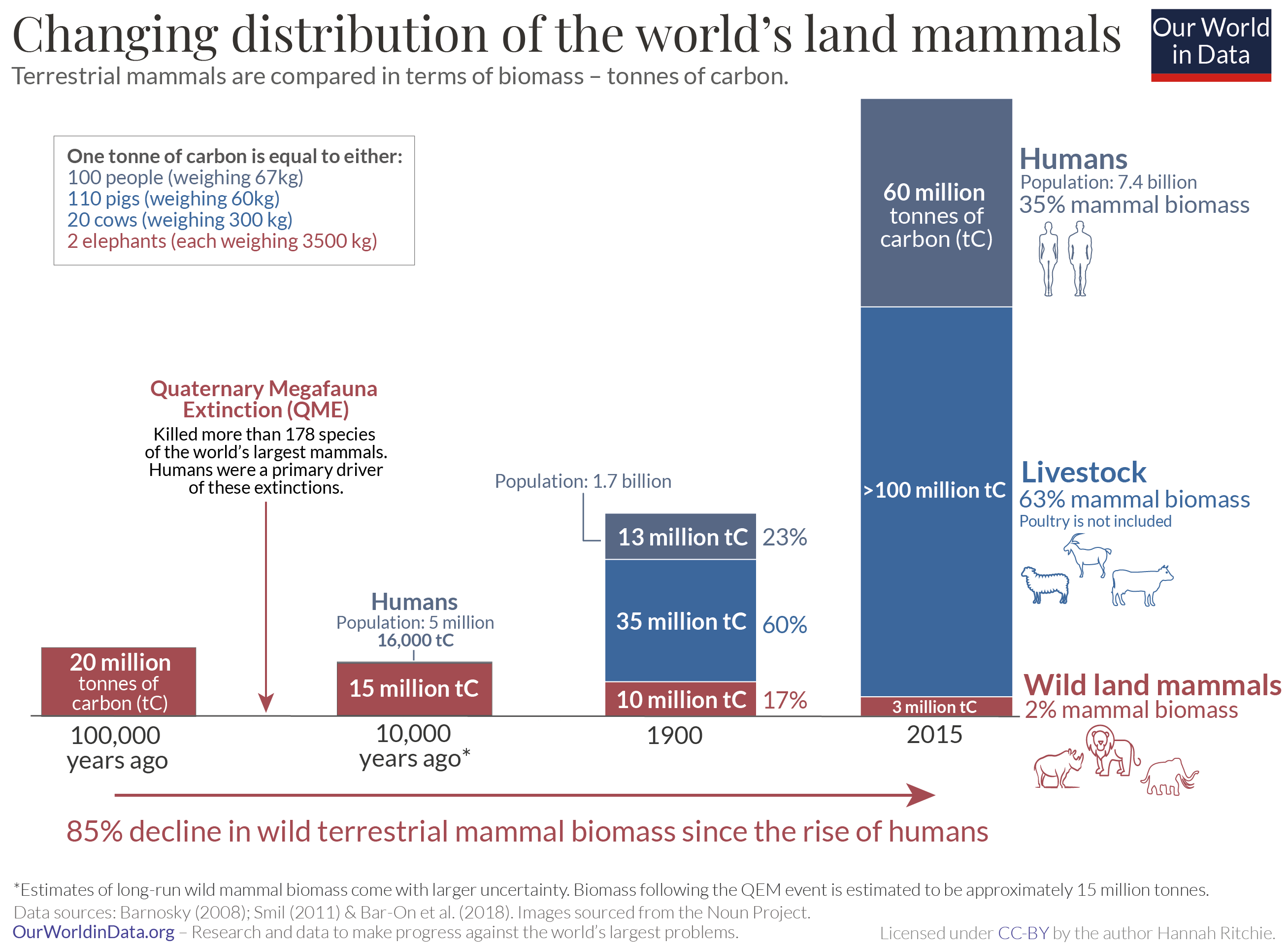
The changing distribution of the world's land mammals in tonnes of carbon. The biomass of wild land mammals has declined by 85% since the emergence of humans, with hunting and agriculture being primary drivers of this decline.

Hunters have been driving forces throughout history in the movement to ensure the preservation of wildlife habitats and wildlife for further hunting. However, excessive hunting and poachers have also contributed heavily to the endangerment, extirpation and extinction of many animals, such as the quagga, the great auk, Steller's sea cow, the thylacine, the bluebuck, the Arabian oryx, the Caspian and Javan tigers, the markhor, the Sumatran rhinoceros, the bison, the North American cougar, the Altai argali sheep, the Asian elephant and many more, primarily for commercial sale or sport. All these animals have been hunted to endangerment or extinction. Poaching currently threatens bird and mammalian populations around the world.

The 2019 Global Assessment Report on Biodiversity and Ecosystem Services lists the direct exploitation of organisms, including hunting, as the second leading cause of biodiversity loss, after land use for agriculture. In 2022, IPBES released another report which stated that unsustainable hunting, along with unsustainable logging and fishing, are primary drivers of the global extinction crisis. A 2023 study published in BioScience posited that the prioritizing of hunting by state agencies in the United States over the rewinding of key species is "reinforcing" the loss of biodiversity.

Hunting has also been found to be a major tool in the fight for population and habitat conservation. In Namibia community based wildlife conservation saw hunting deliver community benefits twice as fast as tourist activity and conservation communities were than four times as likely to see benefits from regulated hunting than tourism. As deer populations in temperate and boreal forests increase due to rising temperatures and a lack of predators, hunting is seen as the most effective way to slow deer population growth and allow for forest regeneration. Studies have also shown hunting to be effective in reducing the prevalence of chronic wasting disease (CWD) in deer.

=== Legislation ===
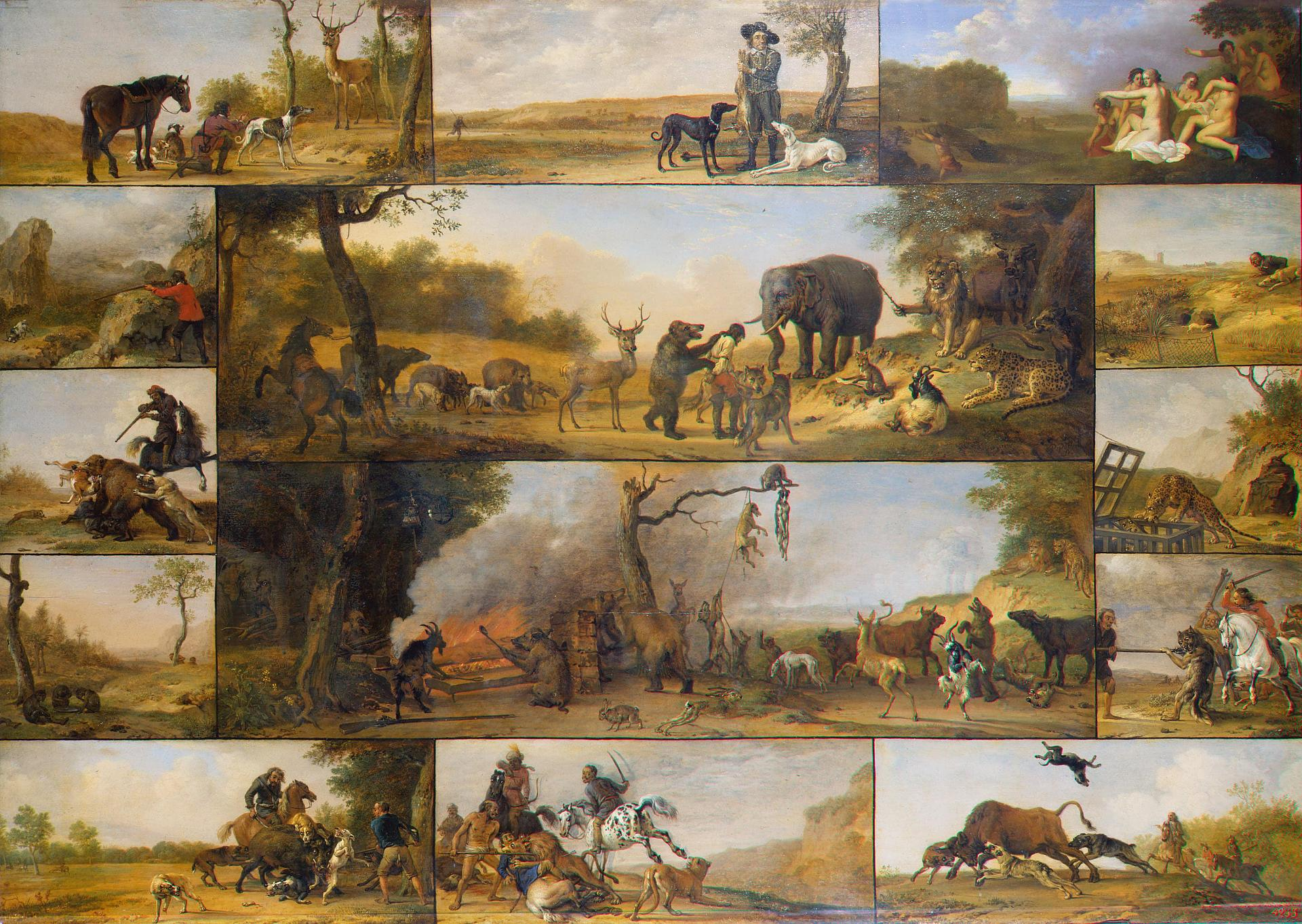
Punishment of a Hunter (c. 1647) by Paulus Potter

==== Pittman–Robertson Wildlife Restoration Act of 1937 ====
In 1937, American hunters successfully lobbied the US Congress to pass the Pittman-Robertson Wildlife Restoration Act, which placed an eleven per cent tax on all hunting equipment. This self-imposed tax now generates over $700 million each year and is used exclusively to establish, restore, and protect wildlife habitats. The act is named for Nevada Senator Key Pittman and Virginia Congressman Absalom Willis Robertson.

==== Federal Duck Stamp program ====
On 16 March 1934, President Franklin D. Roosevelt signed the Migratory Bird Hunting Stamp Act, which requires an annual stamp purchase by all hunters over the age of sixteen. The stamps are created on behalf of the program by the US Postal Service and depict wildlife artwork chosen through an annual contest. They play an important role in habitat conservation because ninety-eight per cent of all funds generated by their sale go directly toward the purchase or lease of wetland habitat for protection in the National Wildlife Refuge System. In addition to waterfowl, it is estimated that one third of the nation's endangered species seek food and shelter in areas protected using Duck Stamp funds.

Since 1934, the sale of Federal Duck Stamps has generated $670 million, and helped to purchase or lease 5,200,000 acres (8,100 sq mi; 21,000 km^{2}) of habitat. The stamps serve as a license to hunt migratory birds, an entrance pass for all National Wildlife Refuge areas, and are also considered collector's items often purchased for aesthetic reasons outside of the hunting and birding communities. Although non-hunters buy a significant number of Duck Stamps, eighty-seven per cent of their sales are contributed by hunters. Distribution of funds is managed by the Migratory Bird Conservation Commission (MBCC).

=== Species ===
==== Arabian oryx ====
The Arabian oryx, a species of large antelope, once inhabited much of the desert areas of the Middle East. Native Bedouin tribes had long hunted the oryx using camels and arrows. Oil exploration made the habitat increasingly accessible, and the species' striking appearance made it a popular quarry for sport hunters (along with the closely related scimitar-horned oryx and addax), including foreign executives of oil companies. The use of automobiles and high-powered rifles removed the oryx's sole advantage of speed, and they became extinct in the wild in 1972 because of sport hunting: the scimitar-horned oryx followed suit, while the addax became critically endangered. However, the Arabian oryx has now made a comeback and been upgraded from "extinct in the wild" to "vulnerable" due to conservation efforts like captive breeding.

==== Markhor ====
The markhor is an endangered species of wild goat which inhabits the mountains of Central Asia and Pakistan. The colonization of these regions by Britain gave British sport hunters access to the species, and they were hunted heavily, almost to the point of extinction. Only their willingness to breed in captivity and the inhospitability of their mountainous habitat prevented this. Despite these factors, the markhor is still endangered.

==== American bison ====
The American bison is a large bovid which inhabited much of western North America prior to the 1800s, living on the prairies in large herds. However, the vast herds of bison attracted market hunters, who killed dozens of bison for their hides only, leaving the rest to rot. Thousands of these hunters quickly eliminated the bison herds, bringing the population from several million in the early 1800s to a few hundred by the 1880s. Conservation efforts have allowed the population to increase, but the bison remains near-threatened due to lack of habitat.

==== White rhino ====
The Journal of International Wildlife Law and Policy cites that the legalization of white rhinoceros hunting in South Africa motivated private landowners to reintroduce the species onto their lands. As a result, the country saw an increase in white rhinos from fewer than one hundred individuals to more than 11,000, even while a limited number were killed as trophies.

However, the illegal hunting of rhinoceros for their horns is currently growing rapidly, which is highly damaging to the population, with 1004 being killed in South Africa alone according to estimates from 2013. The White Rhino (along with the other 4 rhino species: black, Javan, Indian, and Sumatran) are poached due to beliefs that the Rhinos' horns can be used to cure cancer, arthritis, and other diseases and illnesses, even though they are scientifically proven wrong.

==== Other species ====
According to Richard Conniff, Namibia is home to 1,750 of the roughly 5,000 black rhinos surviving in the wild because it allows trophy hunting of various species. Namibia's mountain zebra population has increased to 27,000 from 1,000 in 1982. Elephants, which "are gunned down elsewhere for their ivory", have gone to 20,000 from 15,000 in 1995. Lions, which were on the brink of extinction "from Senegal to Kenya", are increasing in Namibia.

In contrast, Botswana in 2012 banned trophy hunting following a precipitous wildlife decline. The numbers of antelope plummeted across Botswana, with a resultant decline in predator numbers, while elephant numbers remained stable and hippopotamus numbers rose. According to the government of Botswana, trophy hunting is at least partly to blame for this, but many other factors, such as poaching, drought, and habitat loss are also to blame. Uganda recently did the same, arguing that "the share of benefits of sport hunting were lopsided and unlikely to deter poaching or improve [Uganda's] capacity to manage the wildlife reserves." In 2020, Botswana reopened trophy hunting on public lands.

=== Studies ===
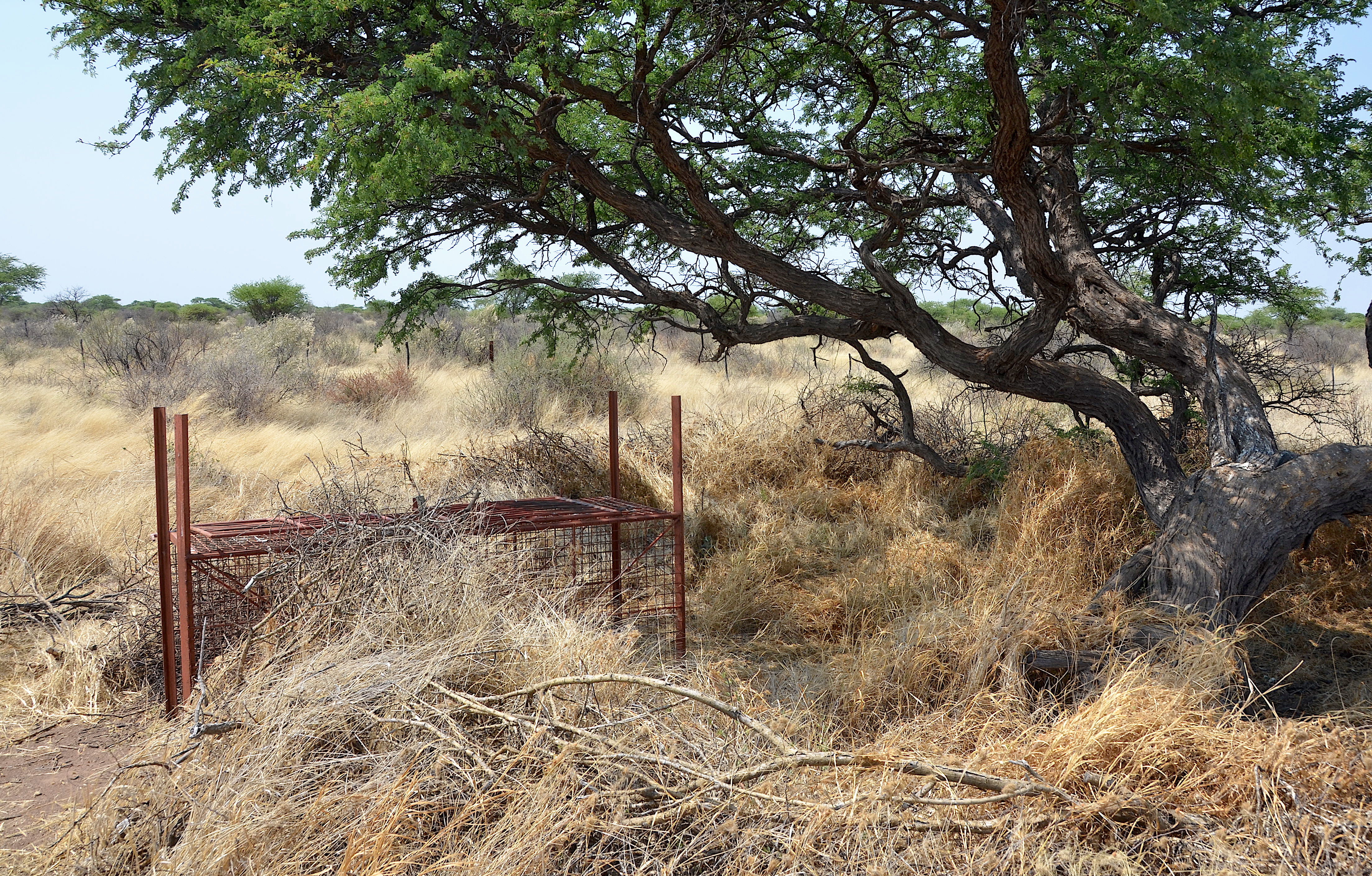
Cage trap (live trap) for cheetahs on a farm in Namibia

A study published by The Wildlife Society concluded that hunting and trapping are cost effective tools that reduce wildlife damage by reducing a population below the capacity of the environment to carry it and changing the behaviors of animals to stop them from causing damage. The study also states that the cessation of hunting could cause wildlife to be severely harmed, rural property values to fall, and the incentive of landowners to maintain natural habitats to diminish.

Although deforestation and forest degradation have long been considered the most significant threats to tropical biodiversity, across Southeast Asia (Northeast India, Indochina, Sundaland, Philippines) substantial areas of natural habitat have few wild animals (>1 kg), bar a few hunting‐tolerant species.

== Opposition ==
Animal rights activists argue that killing animals for sport is unethical, cruel, and unnecessary. They note the suffering and cruelty inflicted on animals hunted for sport: "Many animals endure prolonged, painful deaths when they are injured but not killed by hunters. Hunting disrupts migration and hibernation patterns and destroys families." Animal rights activists also comment that hunting is not needed to maintain an ecological balance, and that "nature takes care of its own". They say that hunting can be combated on public lands by "spread[ing] deer repellent or human hair (from barber shops) near hunting areas". Animal rights activists also argue that hunting is speciesist:

Whether hunters try to justify their killing by citing human deaths caused by wild animals, by making conservationist claims, by claiming that it's acceptable to hunt as long as the animals' bodies are eaten, or simply because of the pleasure it brings them, the fact remains that hunting is morally unacceptable if we consider the interests of nonhuman animals. Hunted animals endure fear and pain, and then are deprived of their lives. Understanding the injustices of speciesism and the interests of nonhuman animals makes it clear that human pleasure cannot justify nonhuman animals' pain.

In Vietnam, Singapore, China, and Brunei, hunting is almost entirely illegal: except for aquatic and marine products, insects and rodents, amphibians, and some reptiles such as snakes and lizards. In China, after 2020, hunting as a livelihood for ethnic minorities almost disappeared due to the ban on consuming bushmeat. In Vietnam, although nominally some non-endangered species in group IIIA can be hunted with permits and forest owners, in reality no permits are issued. Some destructive species like sparrows and squirrels were previously overlooked by the government, but recently, regulations have been tightened. Although hunting some reptiles like sand lizards is illegal, the government considers it legal. A similar situation previously occurred with wild birds; many Vietnamese people consider wild birds as a resource to be exploited rather than a priority for conservation. In one survey, although many people claimed they rarely or never consumed wild animals, when asked if they had eaten egrets or herons, they were surprised. In Singapore, even frogs are considered wild animals.

== In the arts ==
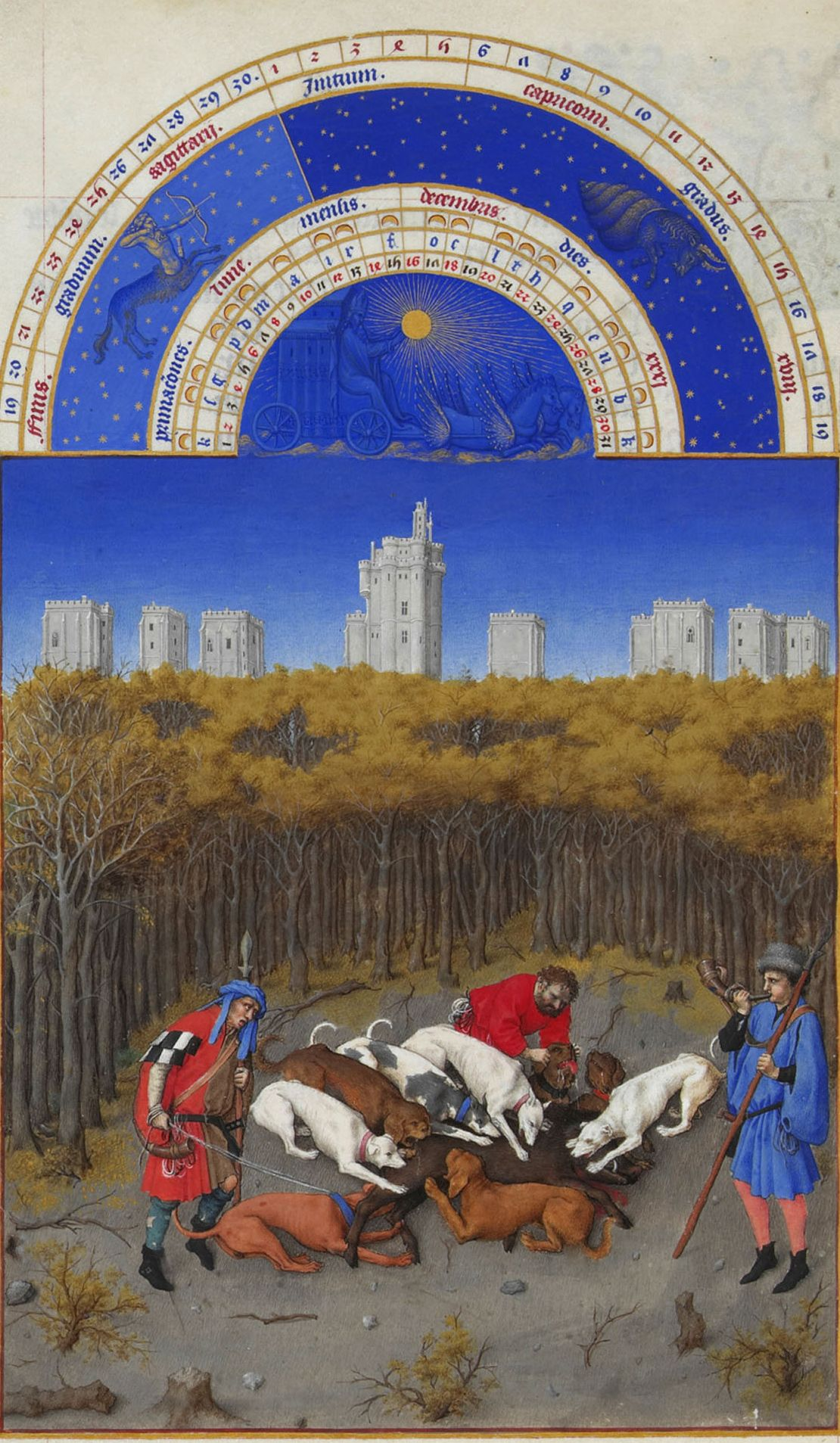
Limbourg Brothers, Boar hunt with hounds, illumination from the Très Riches Heures du duc de Berry, c. 1445

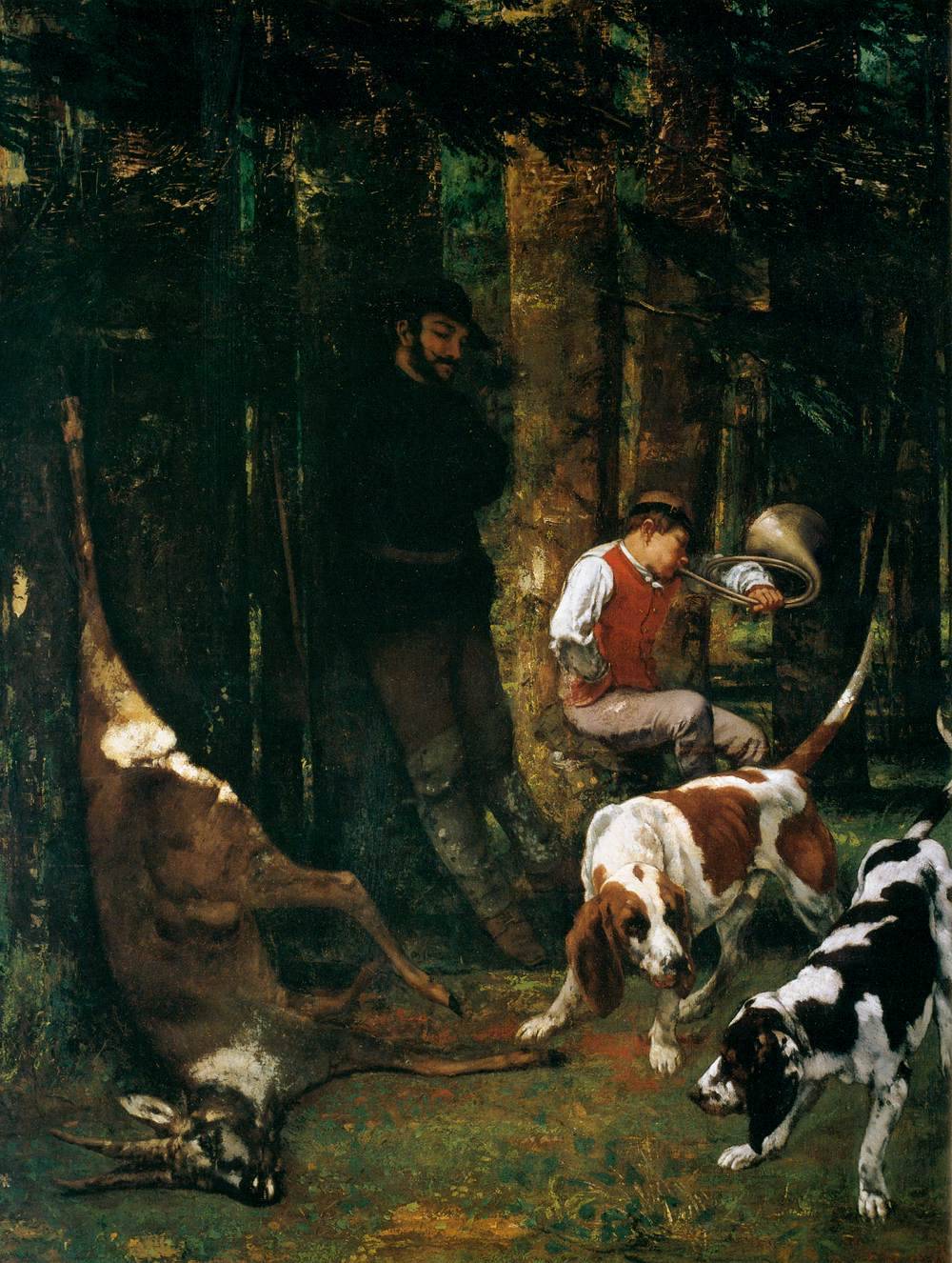
Gustave Courbet, The Kill – Deer Hunting in the Grand Jura Forests, 1857

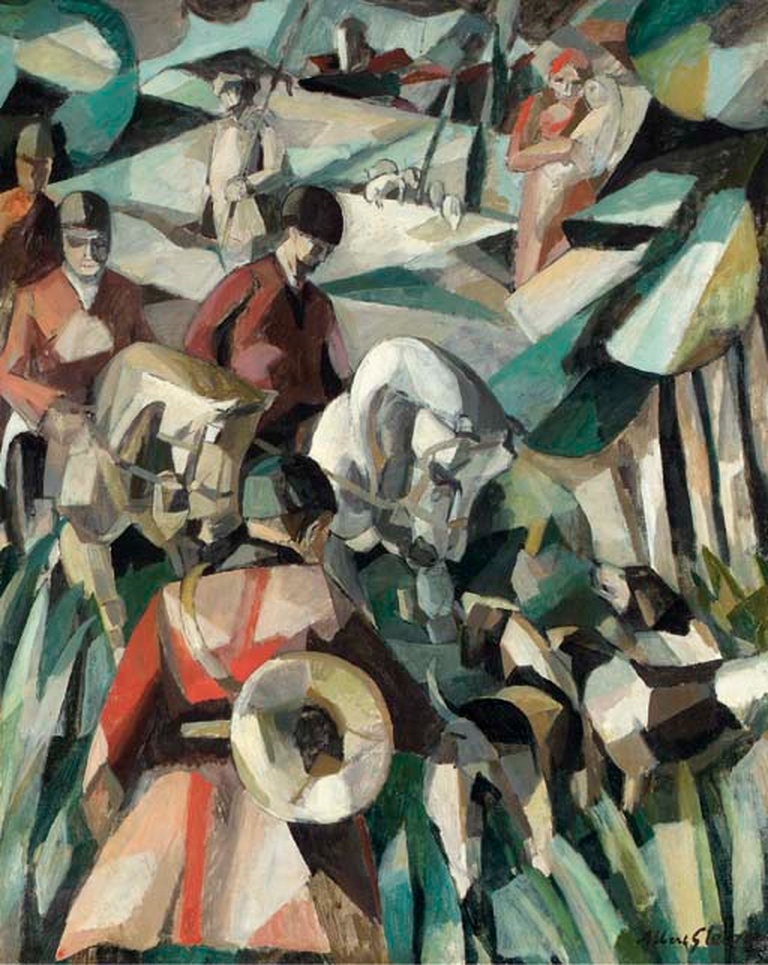
Albert Gleizes, La Chasse (The Hunt), 1911, oil on canvas depicting a scene in the Cubist style of hunting by horseback in France

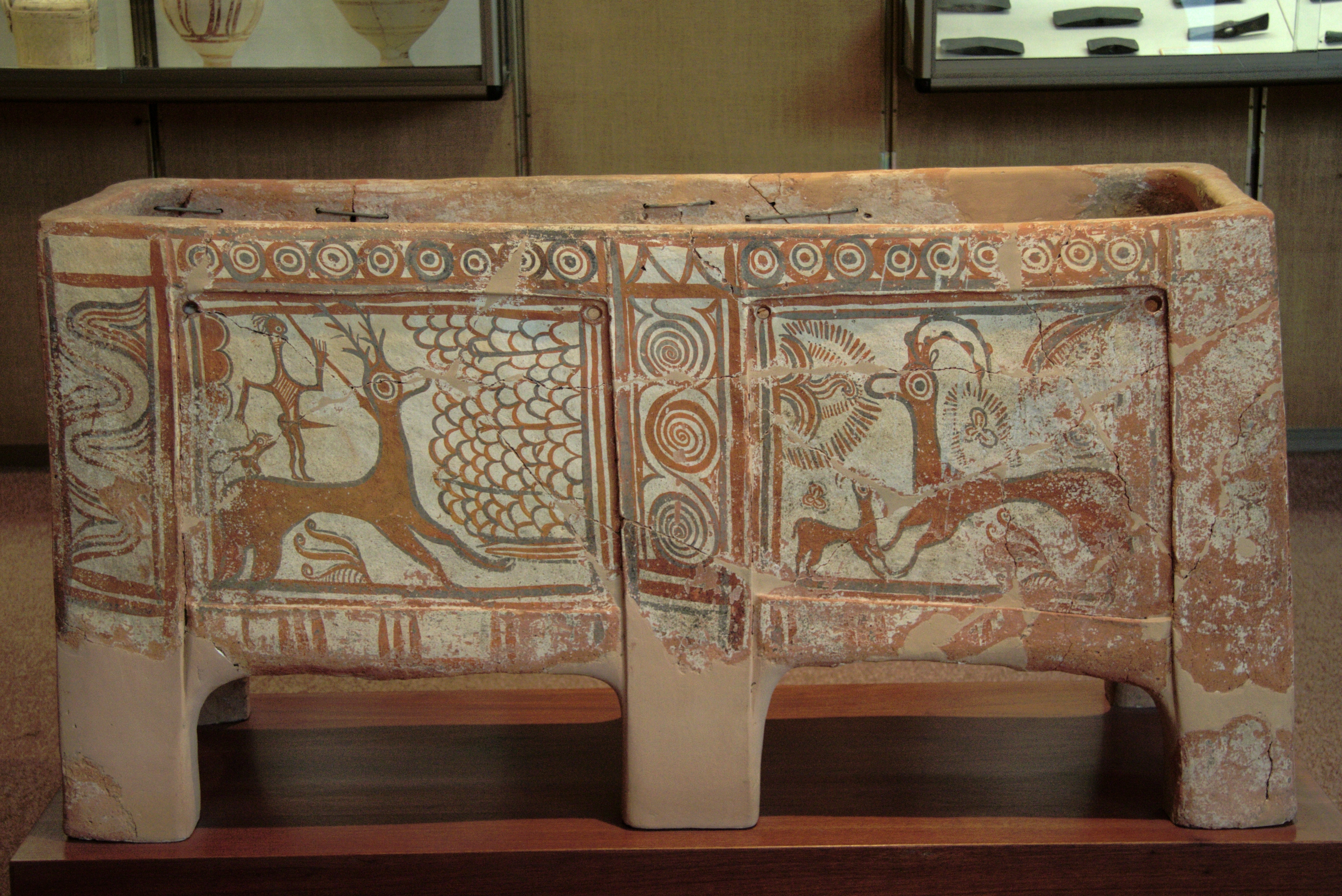
Hunting of deer and ibex, Minoan larnax, prepalatial period

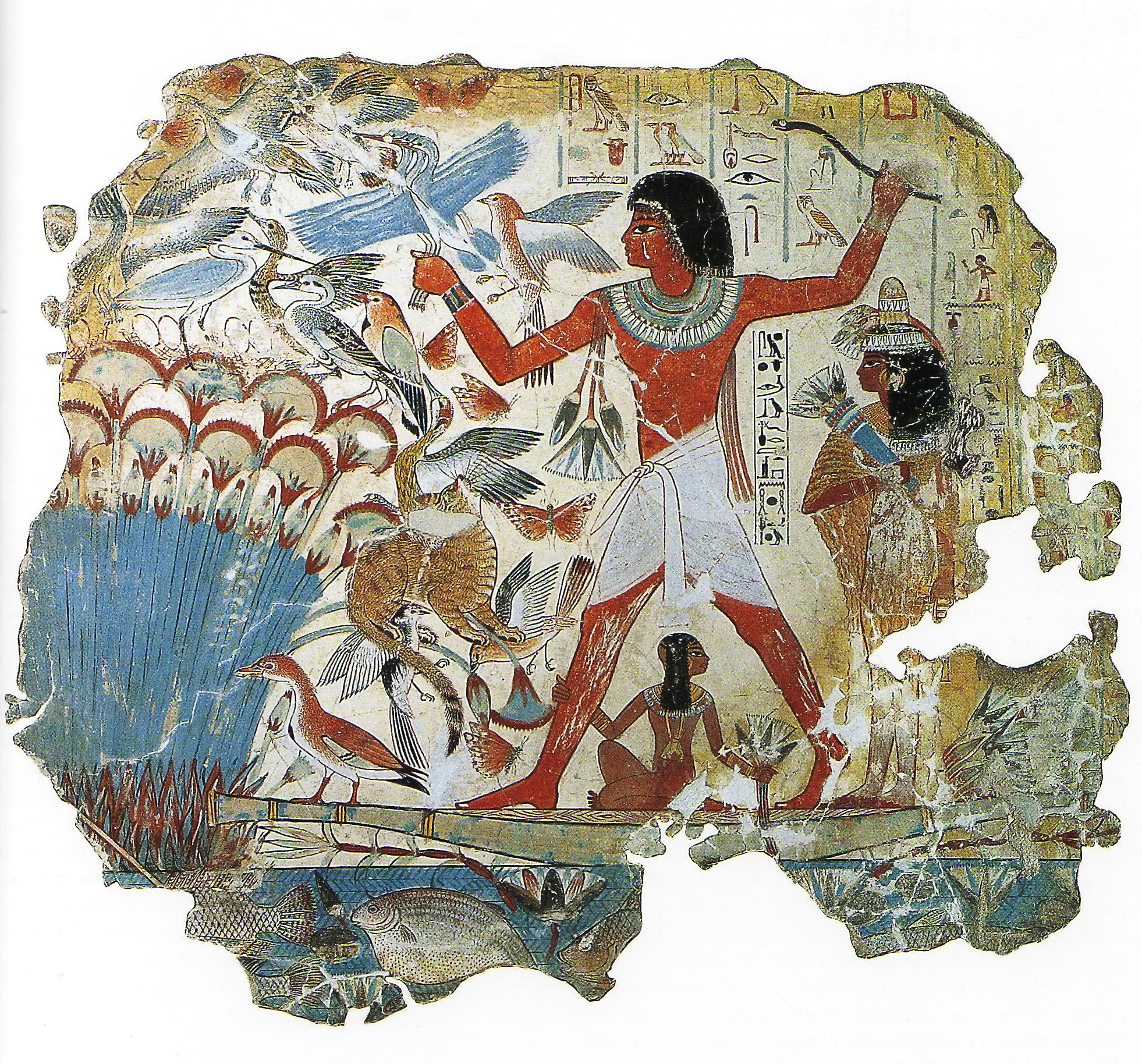
Hunting in the papyrus thicket, mural from a tomb in Thebes, Egypt, before 1350 BC

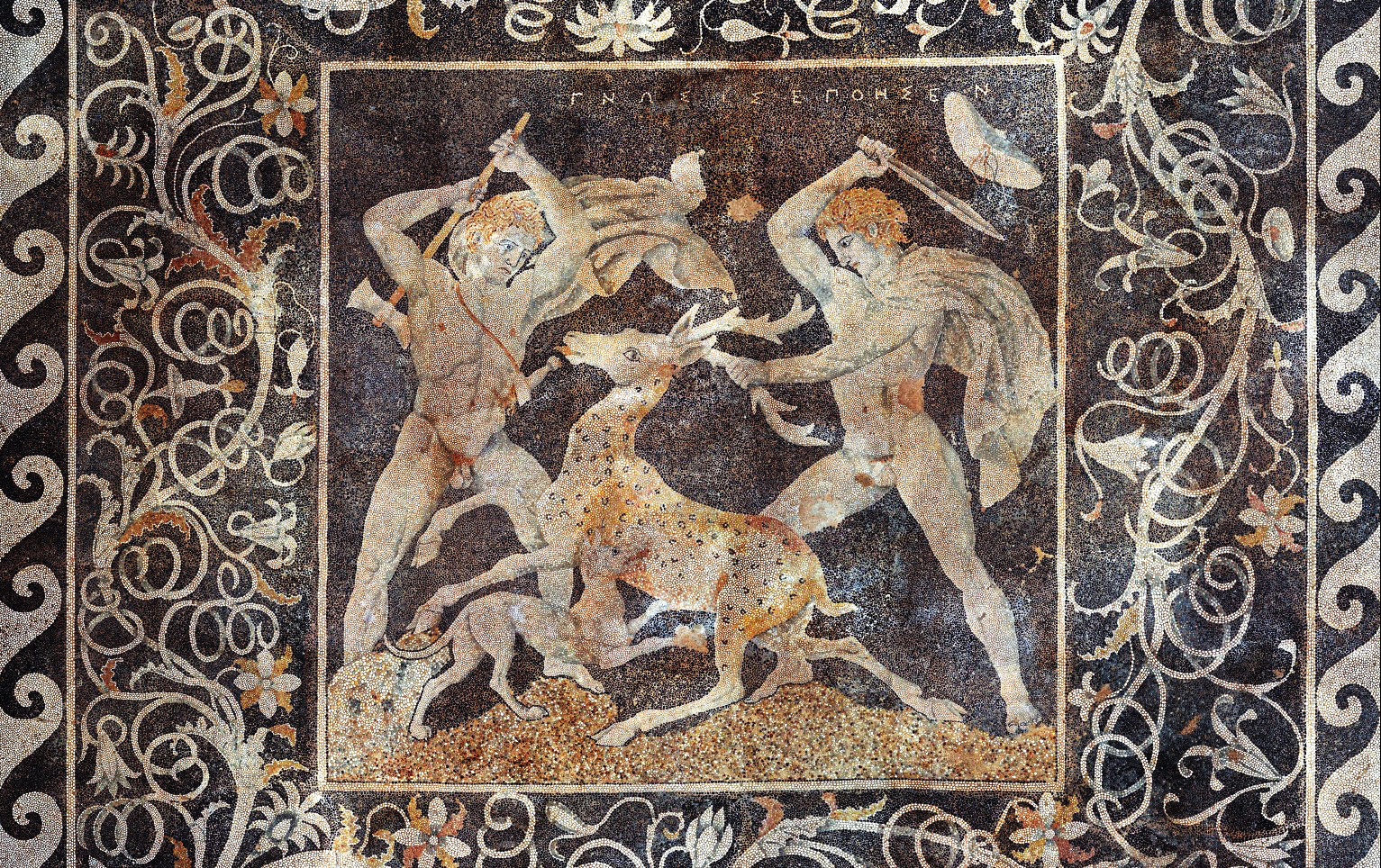
The Stag hunt mosaic, c. 300 BC, Pella, Greece

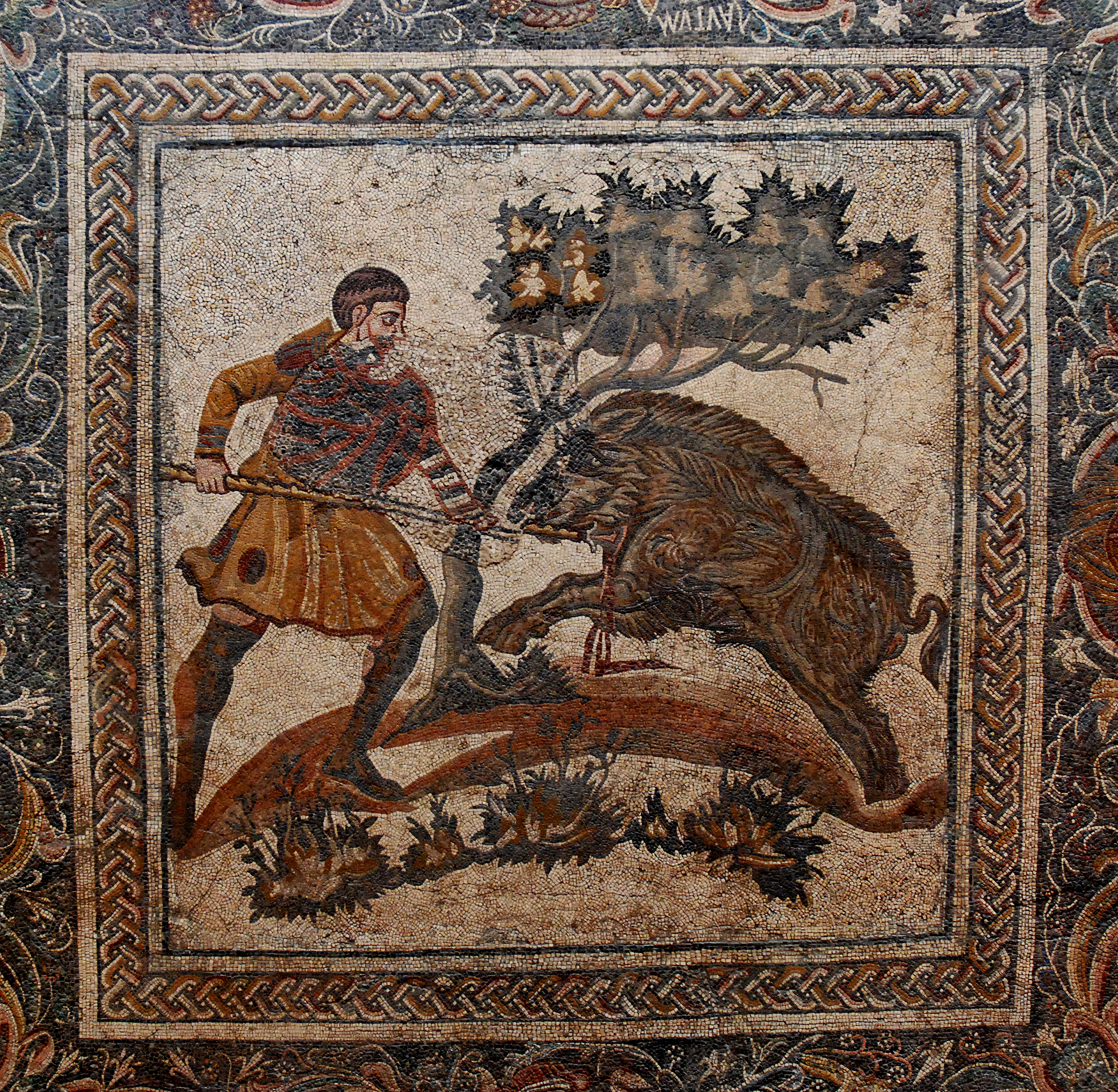
Man hunting a boar, Roman mosaic, 4th century AD

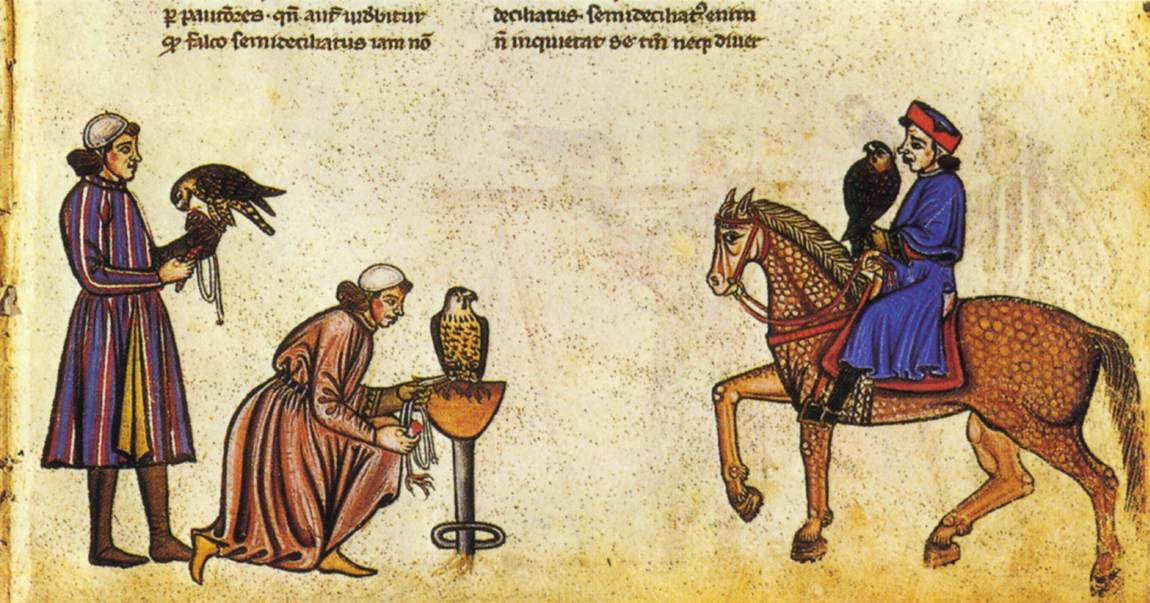
Illustration from the falconry book De arte venandi cum avibus written by Emperor Frederick II, c. 1245

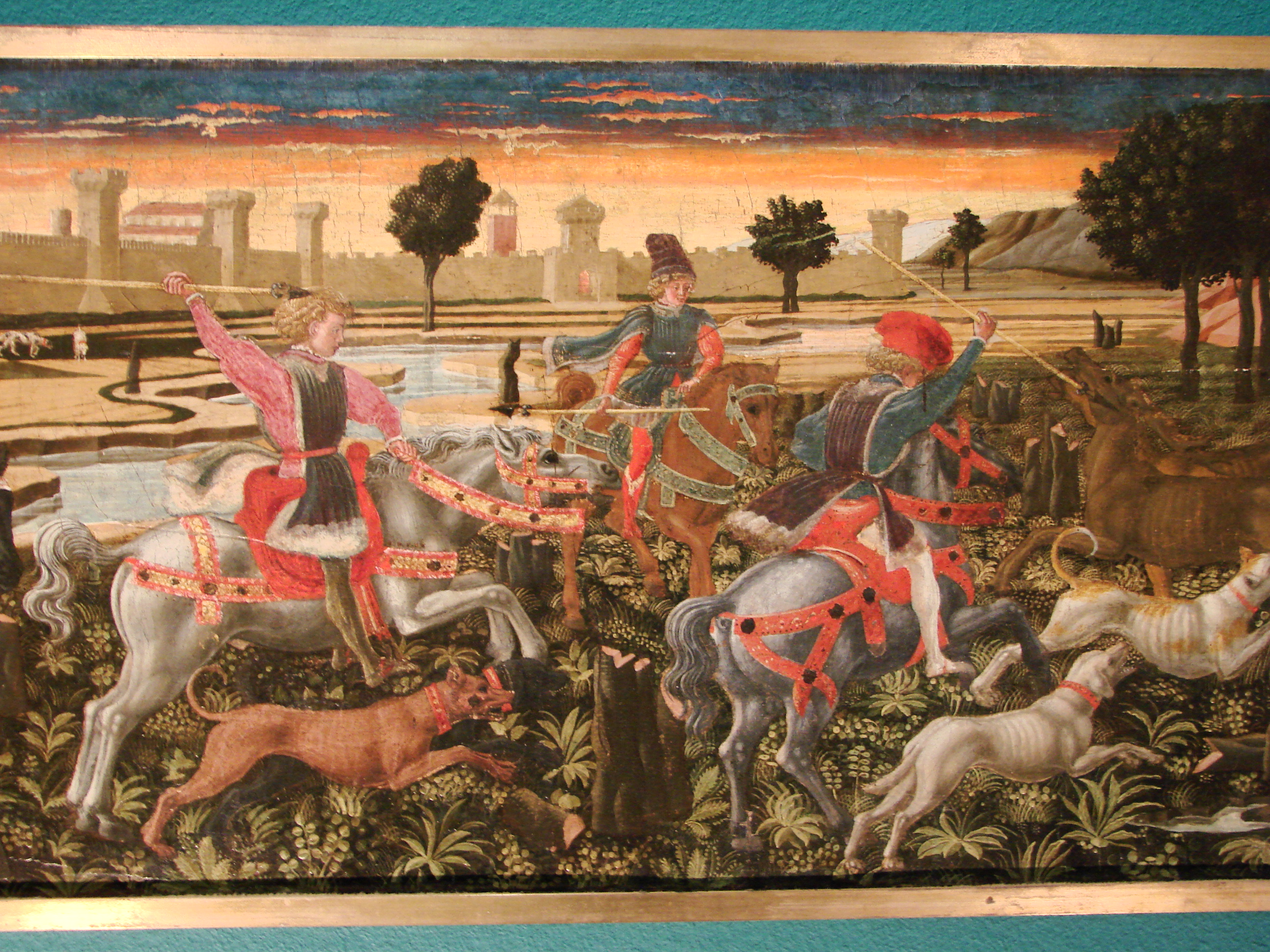
Giovanni di Francesco (?),
La caccia, c. 1455, tempera on wood, detail

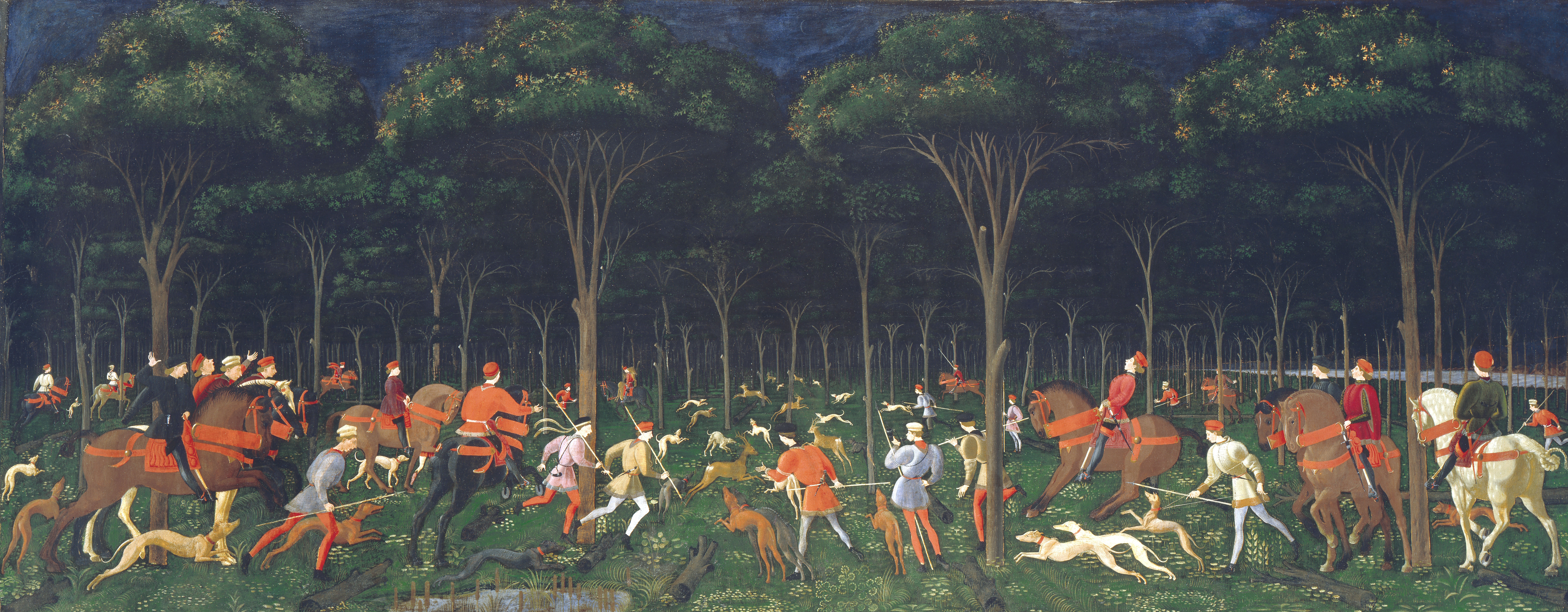
Paolo Uccello, Caccia notturna (The Hunt in the Forest), c. 1475

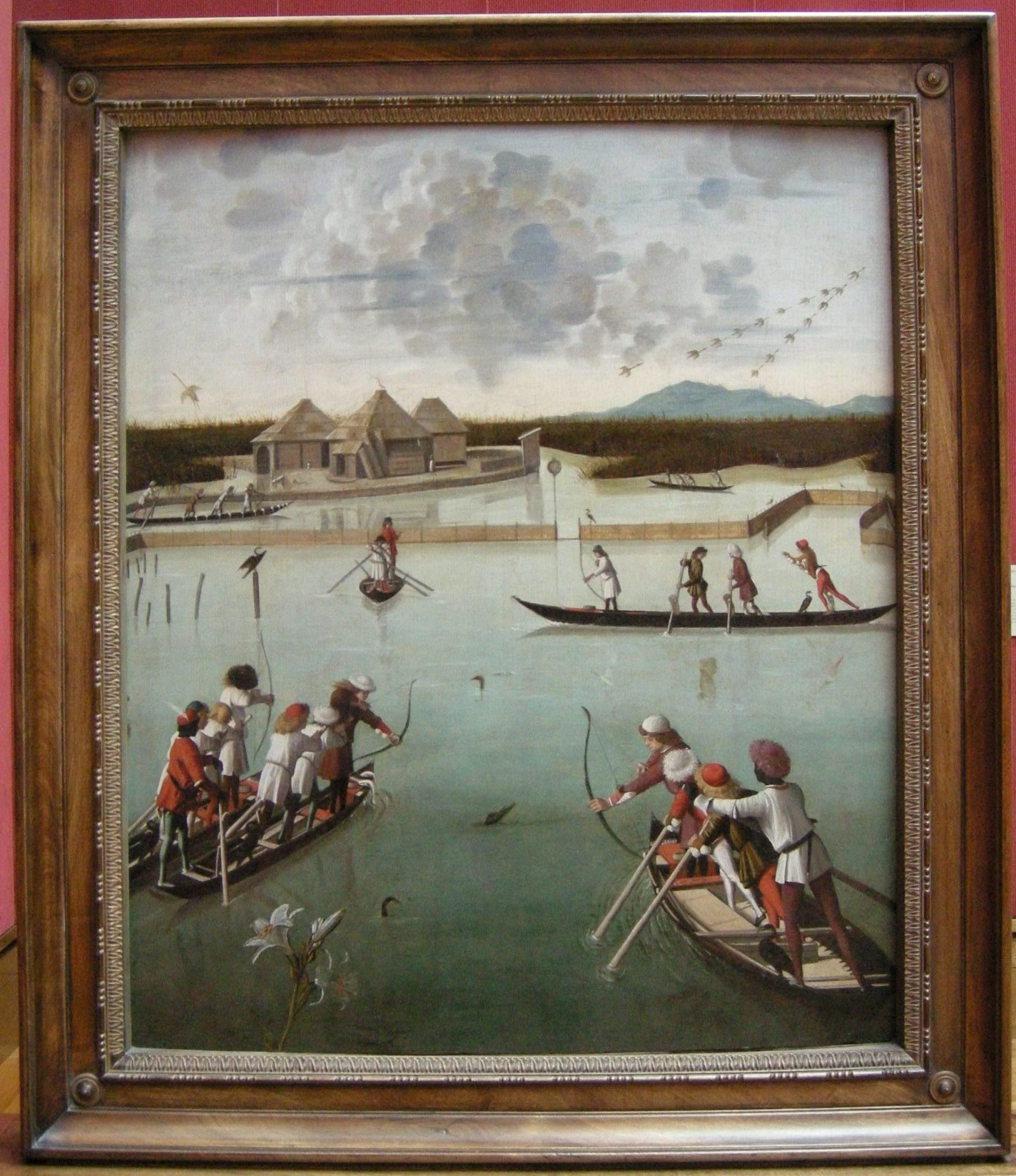
Vittore Carpaccio, Caccia in laguna (Hunt in the Lagoon), c. 1490

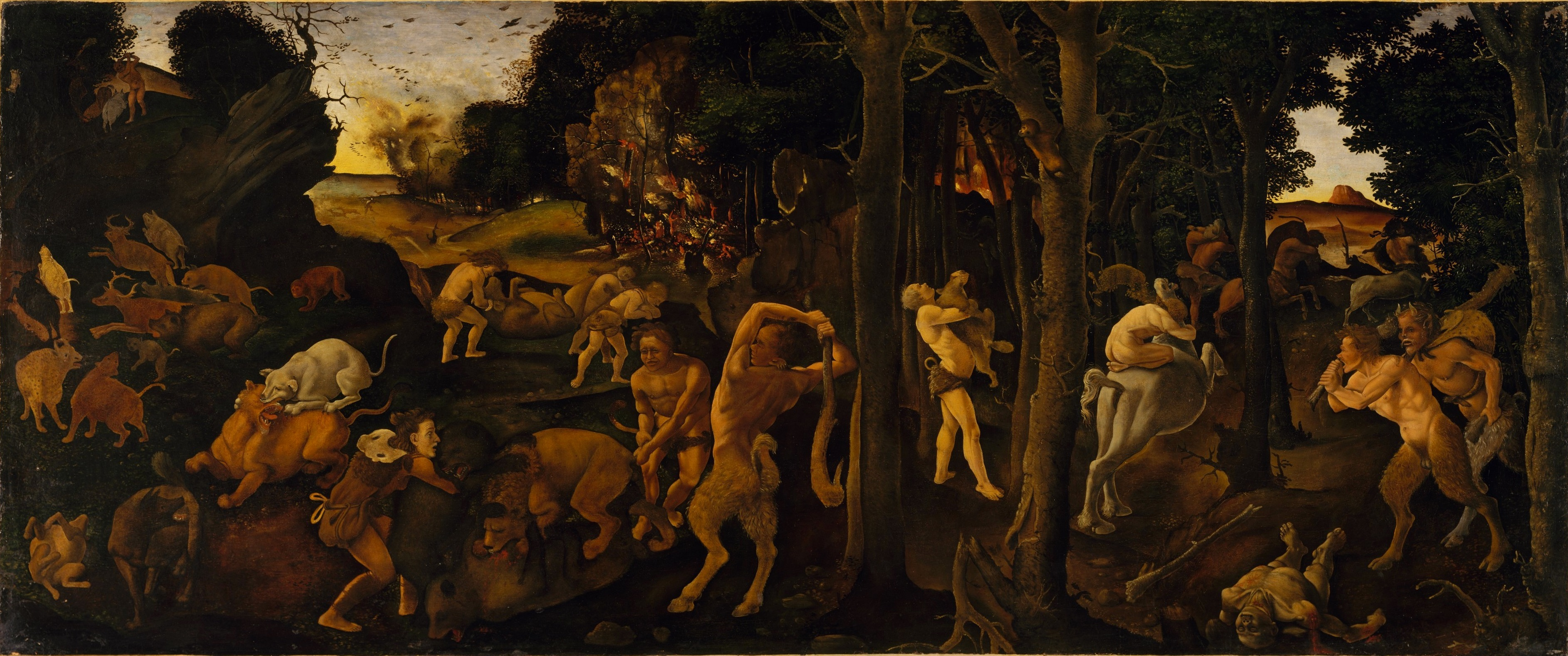
Piero di Cosimo,
A Hunting Scene, 1508

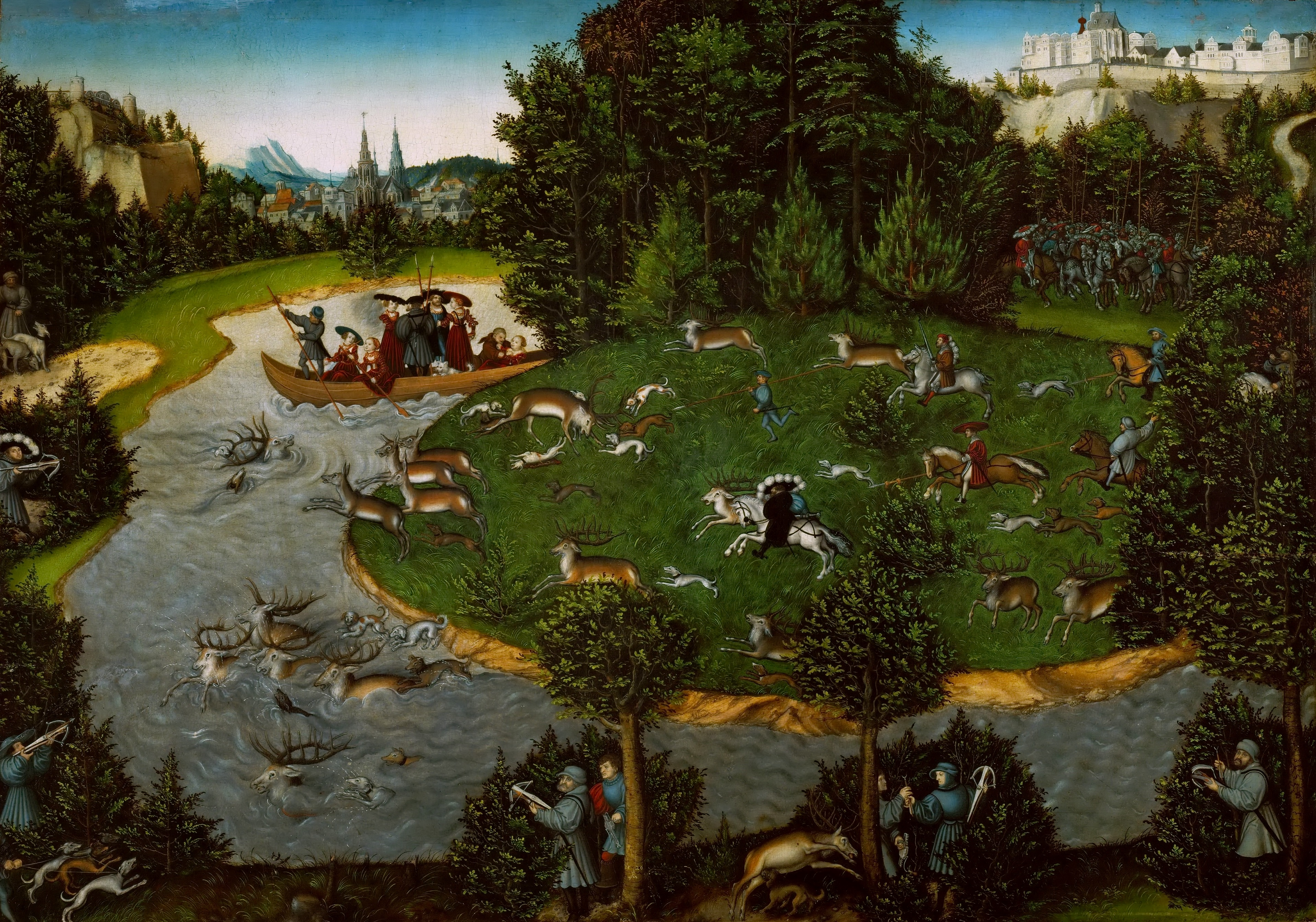
Lucas Cranach the Elder, A Stag Hunt with the Elector Friedrich the Wise, 1529

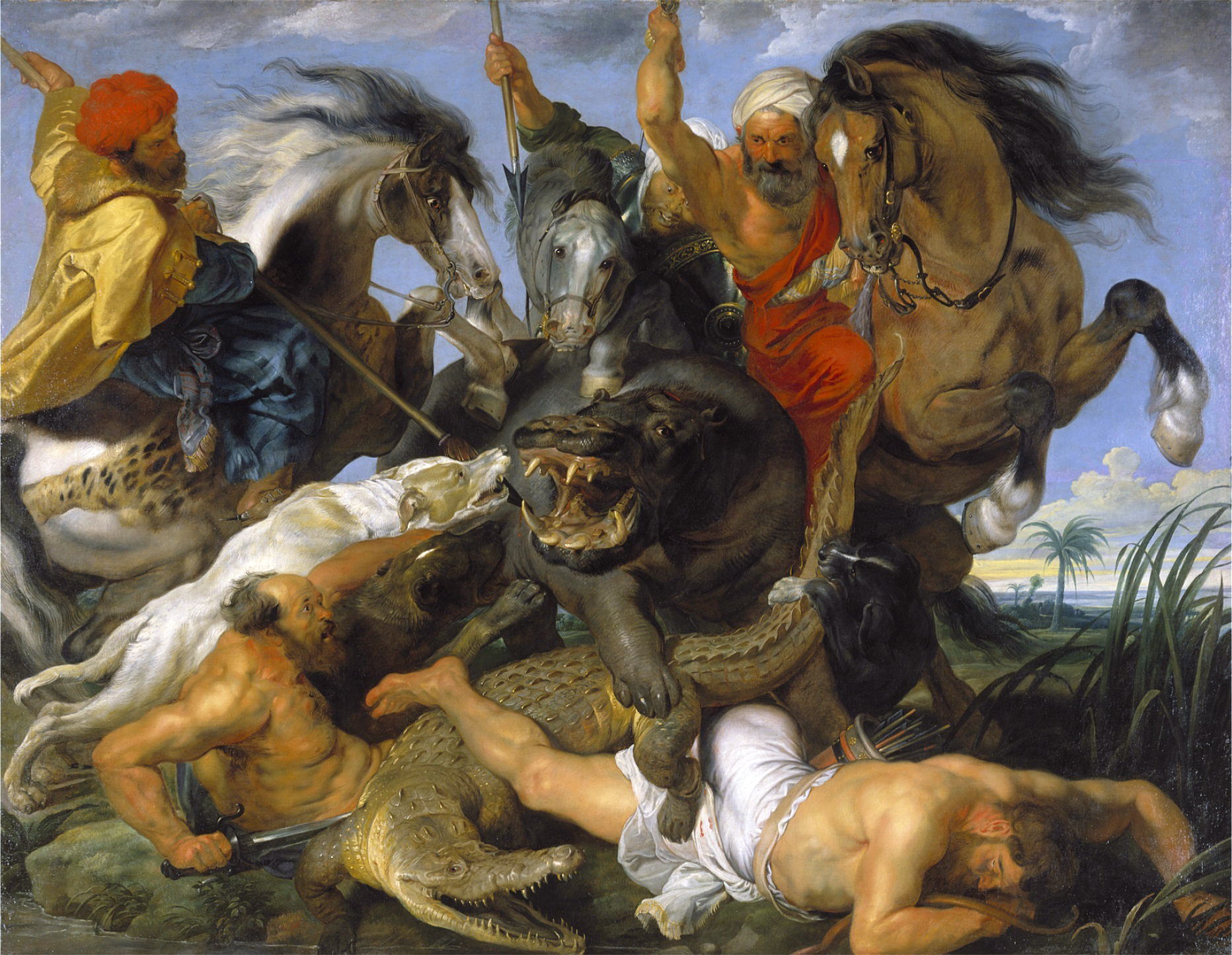
Peter Paul Rubens, Hippopotamus and Crocodile Hunt, c. 1615

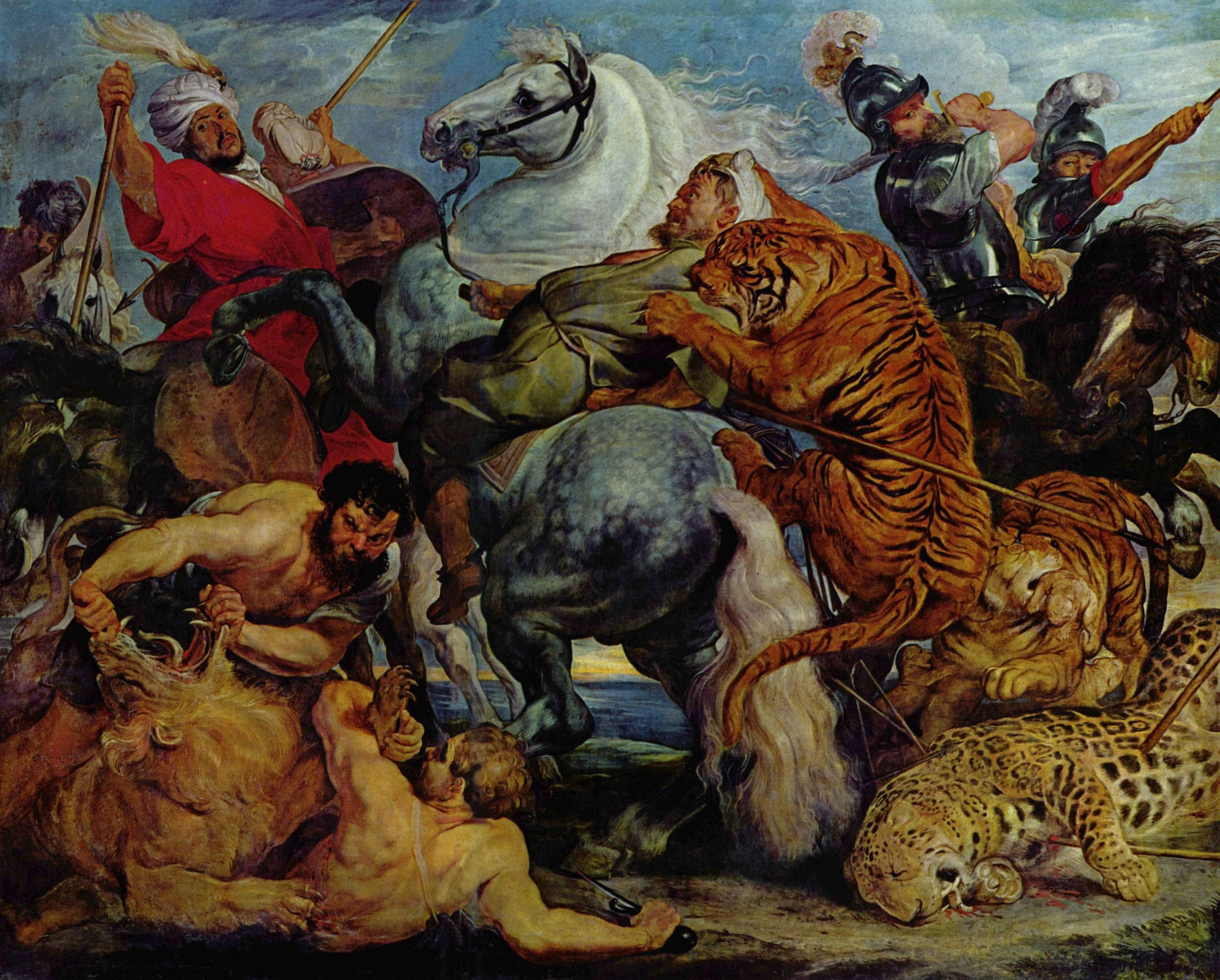
Peter Paul Rubens, Tiger and Lion Hunt, 1618

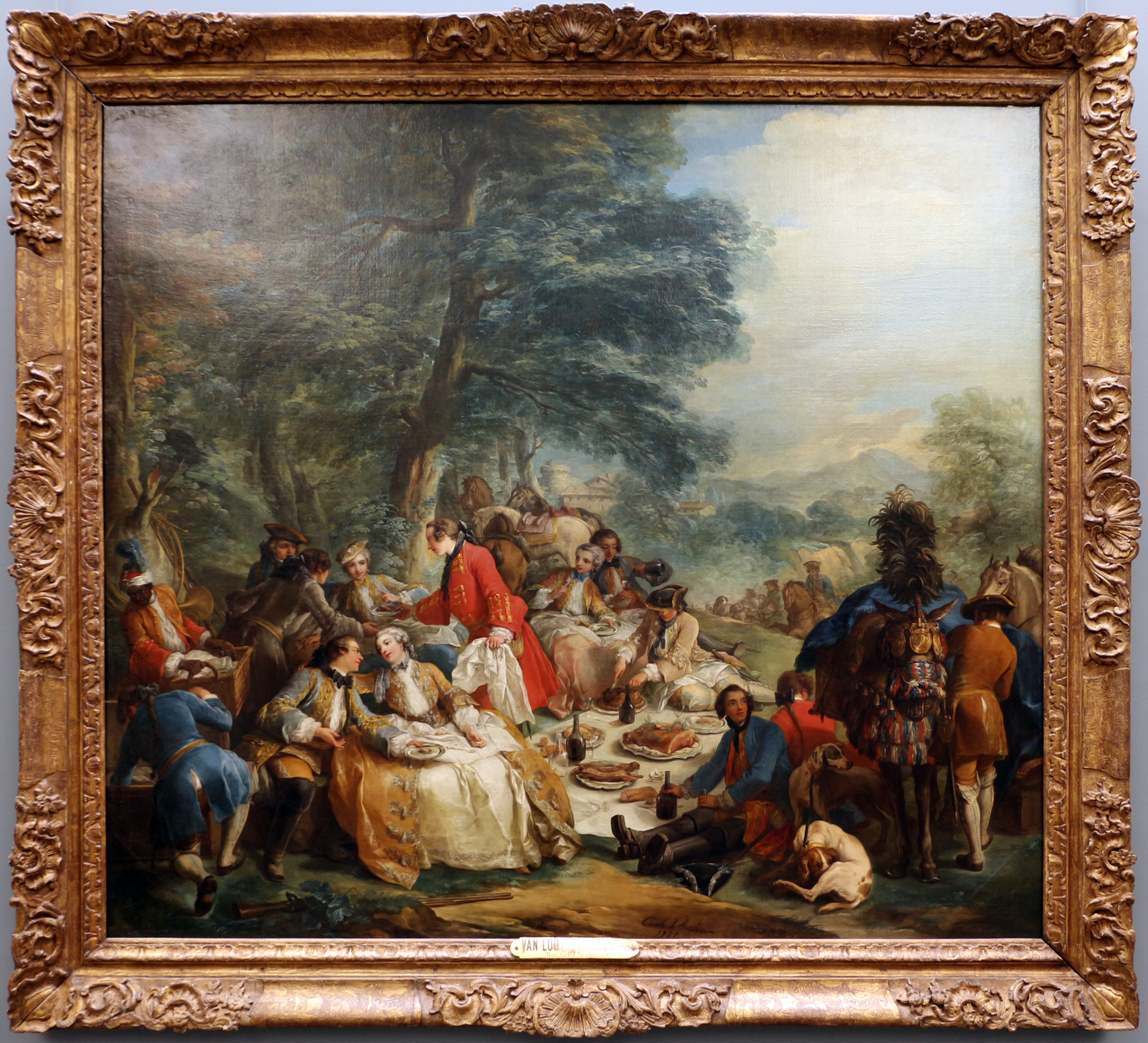
Charles André van Loo, Halte de chasse (Halt During the Hunt), 1737

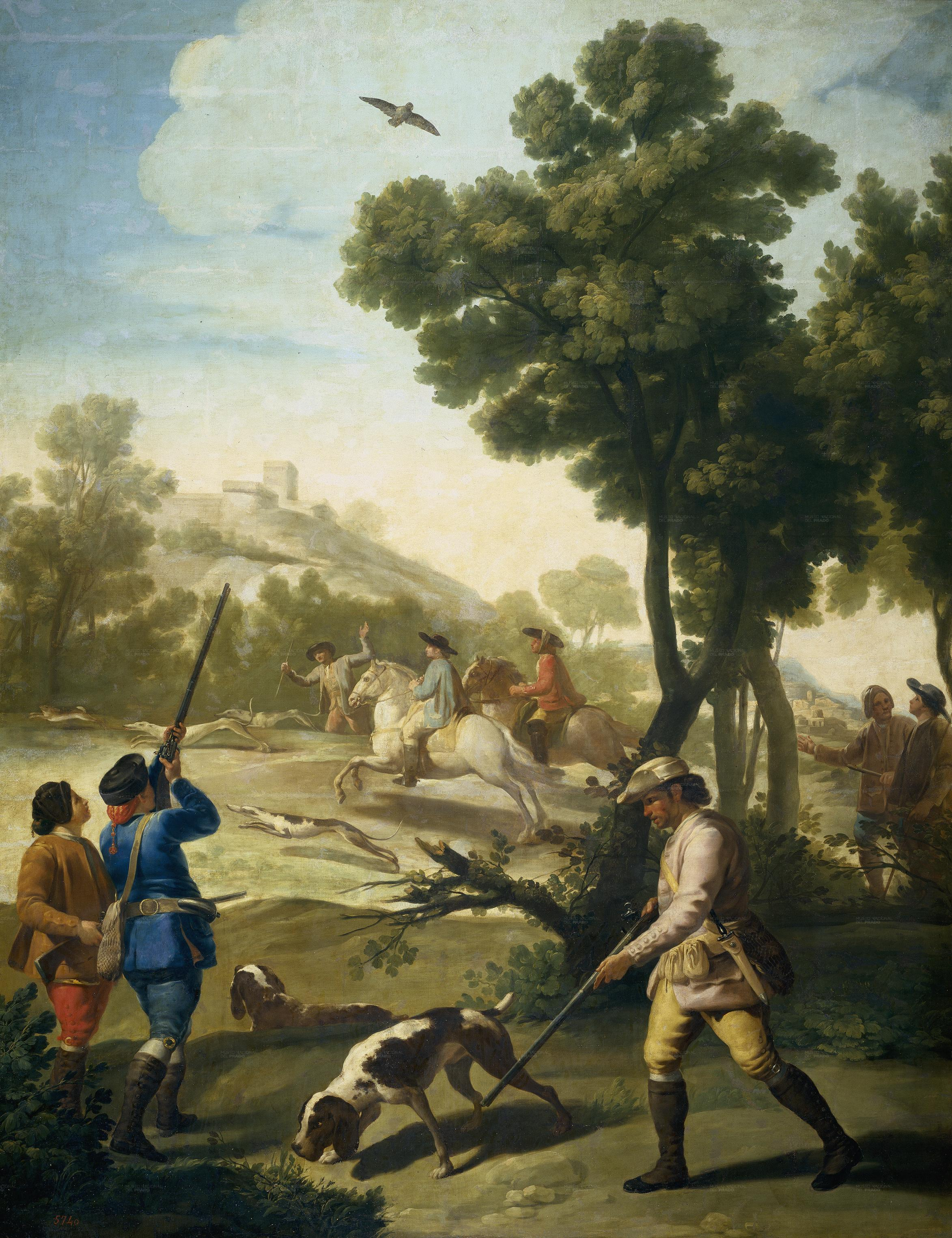
Francisco Goya, The Quail Shoot, 1775

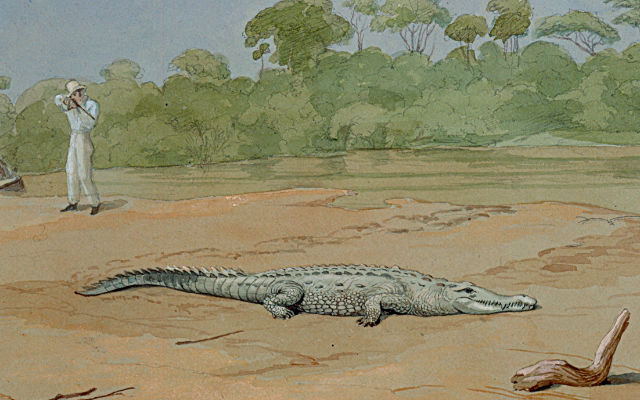
Edward Walhouse Mark, Caimán del Magadalena, 1843 - 1856

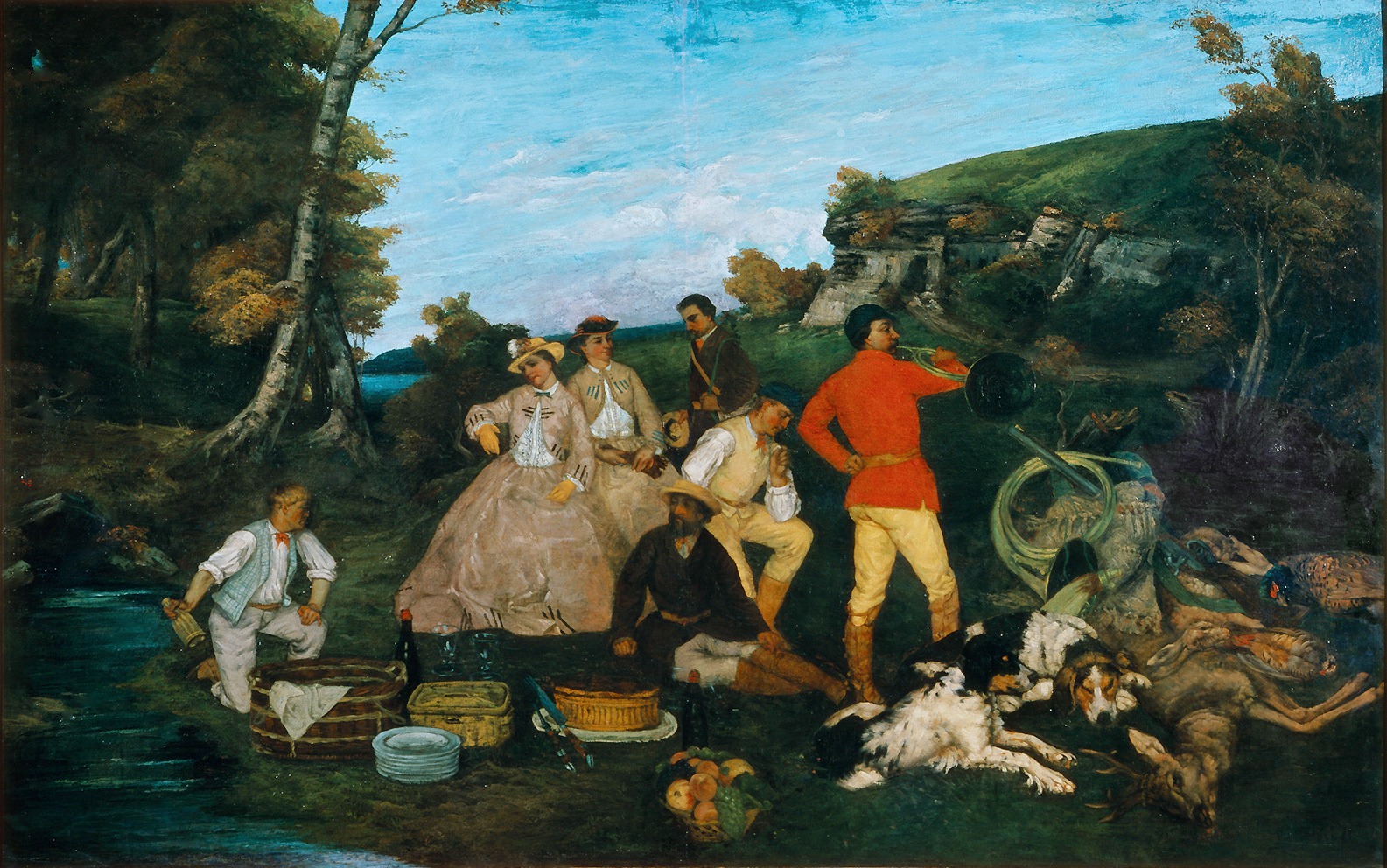
Gustave Courbet, The Hunt Breakfast, 1858

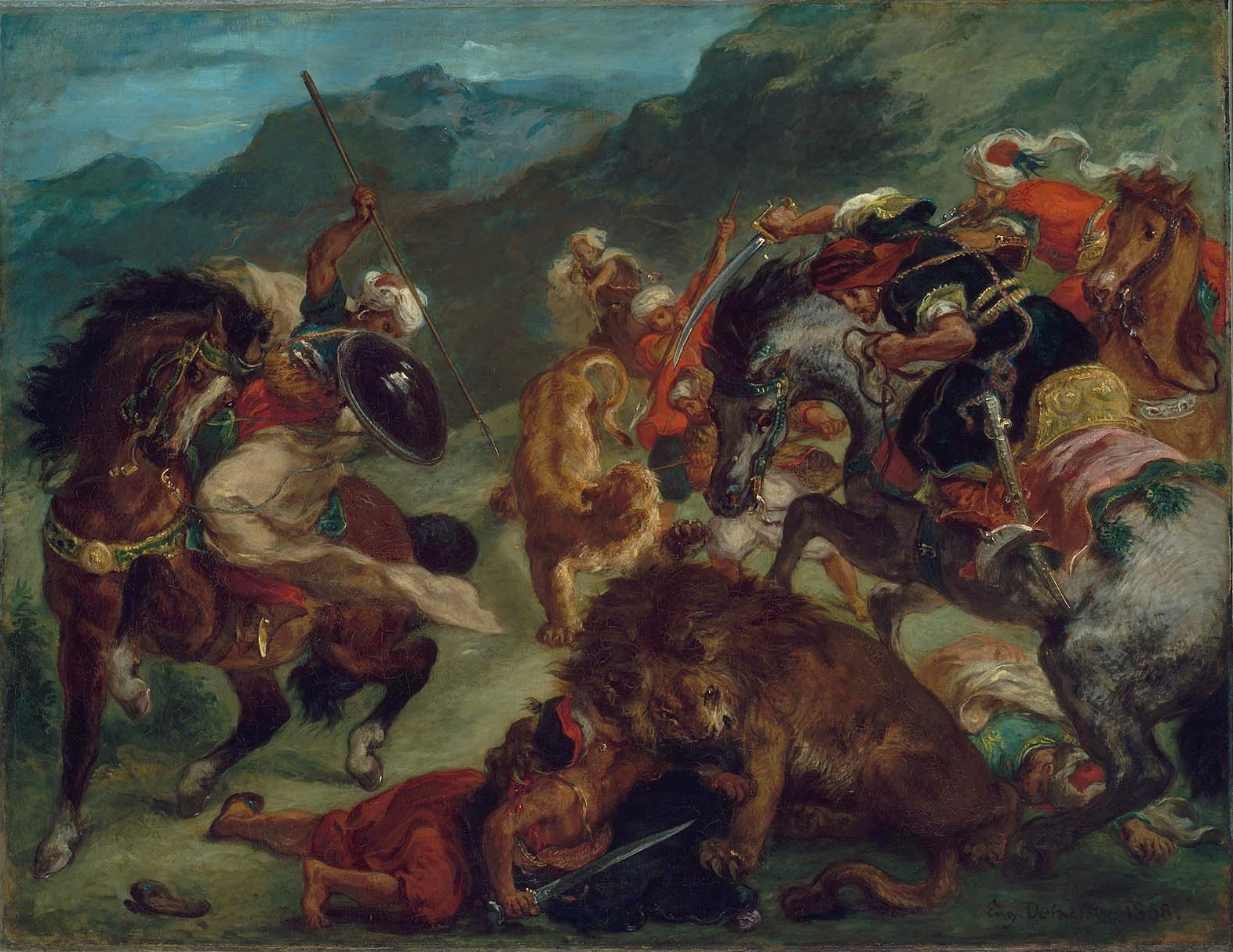
Eugène Delacroix, Chasse au lion (Lion Hunt), 1858

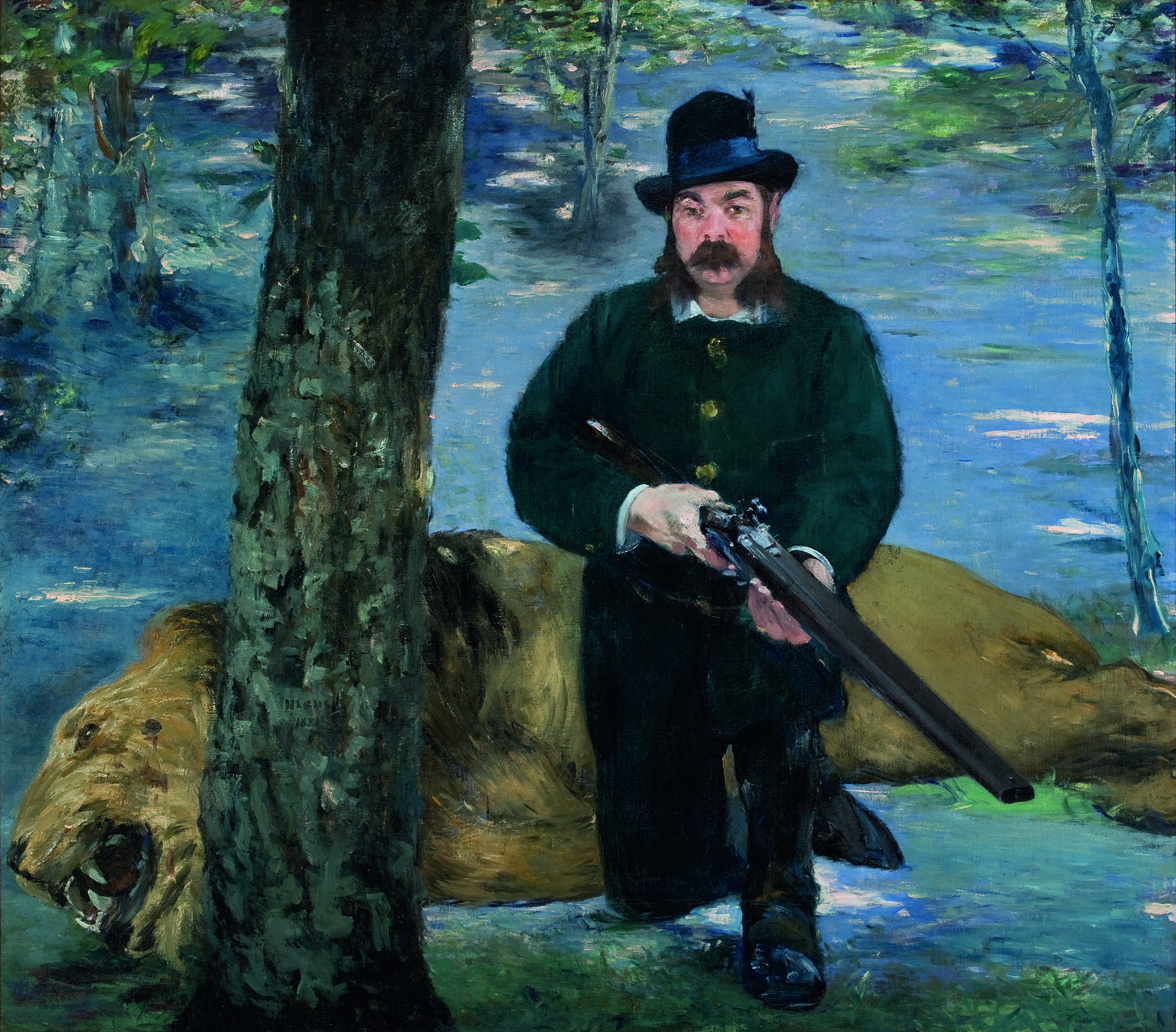
Édouard Manet, Portrait of Monsieur Pertuiset the Lion-Hunter, 1881

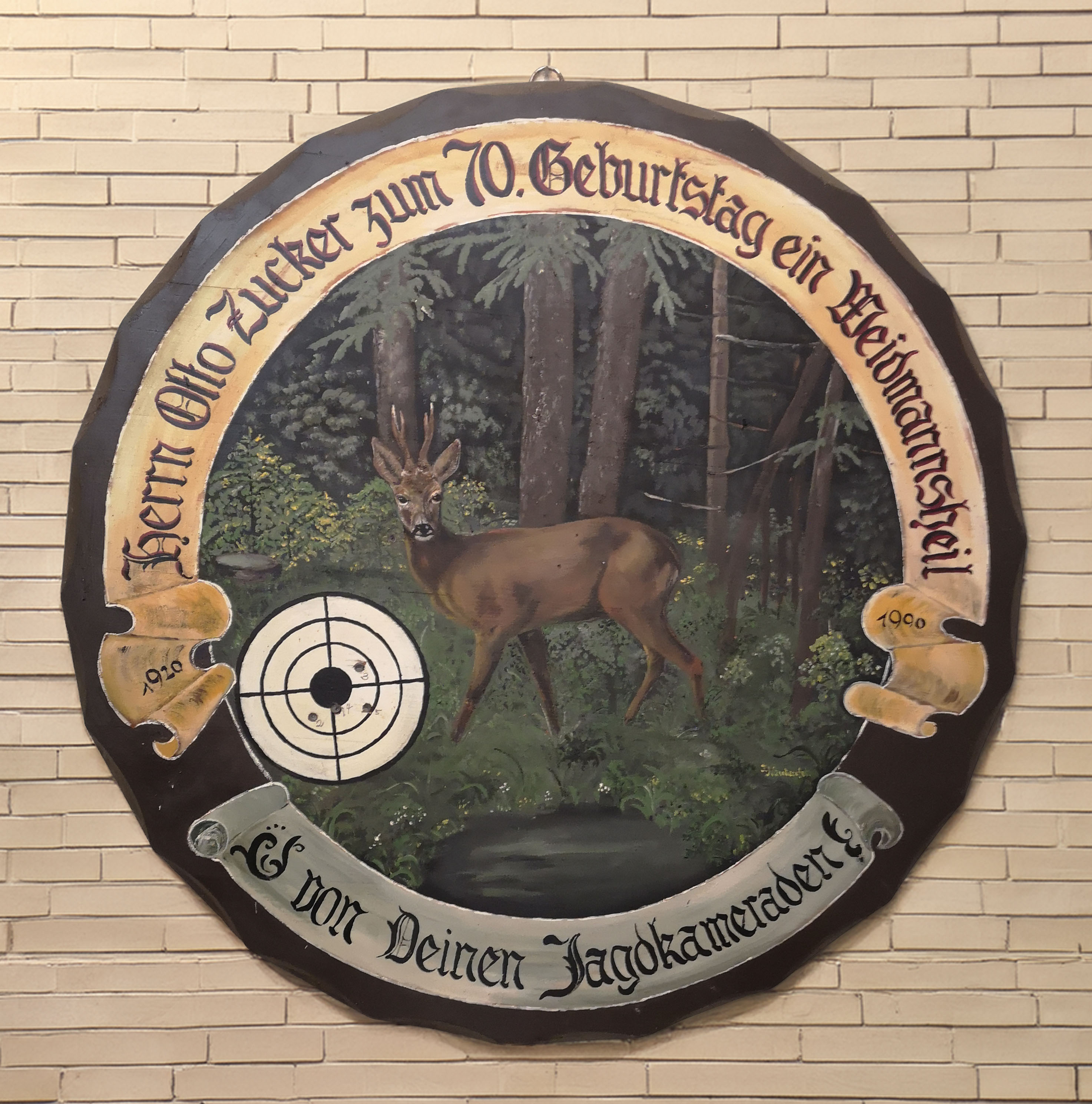
Painted hunting plaque made for an Austrian hunter, 1990; an example of rustic hunting traditions

== See also ==
- Poaching
- Anti-hunting
- Bambi effect
- Big five game
- Big-game hunting
- Blood sport
- Bowhunting
- Chase
- Defaunation
- Federation of Associations for Hunting and Conservation of the EU
- Game (hunting)
- Human hunting
- Hunt Saboteurs Association (HSA)
- Hunting horn
- Hunting weapon
