= Griffon Vendéen =

Griffon Vendéen may refer to any one of a number of French dog breeds:

- Briquet Griffon Vendéen
- Grand Basset Griffon Vendéen
- Grand Griffon Vendéen
- Petit Basset Griffon Vendéen
