= Bulgarian Scenthound =

Bulgarian Scenthound Balgarsko Gonche
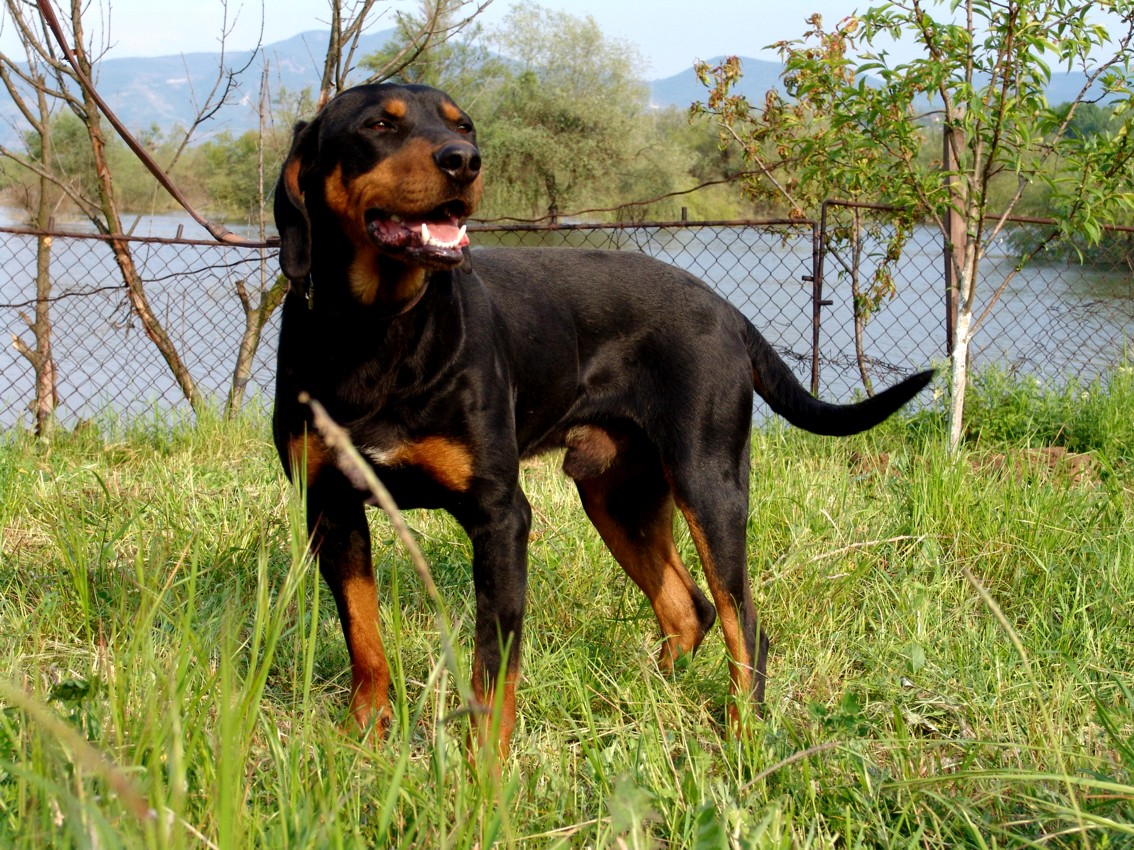
- A Bulgarian Scenthound
- Other names: Bicolor hound or Ludogorsko gonche
- Origin: Bulgaria
Traits
Height	Males	49-58 cm
	Females	47-58 cm
Kennel club standards
- BRFK: standard

The Bulgarian Scenthound (Bulgarian: българско гонче, balgarsko gonche) is a dog breed from Bulgaria. It originated in the Ludogorie region of northern Bulgaria, and is the most widely distributed smooth-haired hunting dog in Bulgaria. It is a non-standardised breed but conforms to hound body morphology.

The native breeds of the Balkans that are its closest relatives are the Greek Harehound, Serbian Hound, and the Transylvanian Hound.

== History ==
The breed's precise origins are uncertain. It forms part of the wider population of Balkan hunting hounds, which also includes the Greek Harehound, Serbian Hound and Transylvanian Hound. Its alternative name, Ludogorsko gonche, refers to the Ludogorie region.

Todor Gaytandzhiev wrote the first breed standard in 1968. In the late 1970s, the Bulgarian Hunting and Fishing Union established a breeding facility for hunting dogs in Ruse, where efforts were made to select and standardise the breed. Bulgarian Scenthounds were presented at the World Hunting Exhibition in Plovdiv in June 1981. A revised standard was prepared by Viktor Lozenski in 1986.

== Characteristics ==
The Bulgarian Scenthound is a medium-sized dog with a strong, slightly elongated body. The ears hang close to the cheeks, and the eyes are dark brown. Its coat is short, coarse and close-fitting, with a developed undercoat. The principal colour is black with brown or tan markings on the muzzle, chest, limbs and underside of the tail, and above the eyes. Small white markings on the toes are permitted by the published breed standard.

The standard specifies a height at the withers of 54–58 cm (21–23 in) for males and 50–54 cm (20–21 in) for females. The corresponding weights are 23–25 kg (51–55 lb) and 18–20 kg (40–44 lb).

== See also ==
- List of dog breeds
- Bulgarian Shepherd Dog (native Bulgarian dog)
- Karakachan dog (native Bulgarian dog)
