= Laconian (dog) =

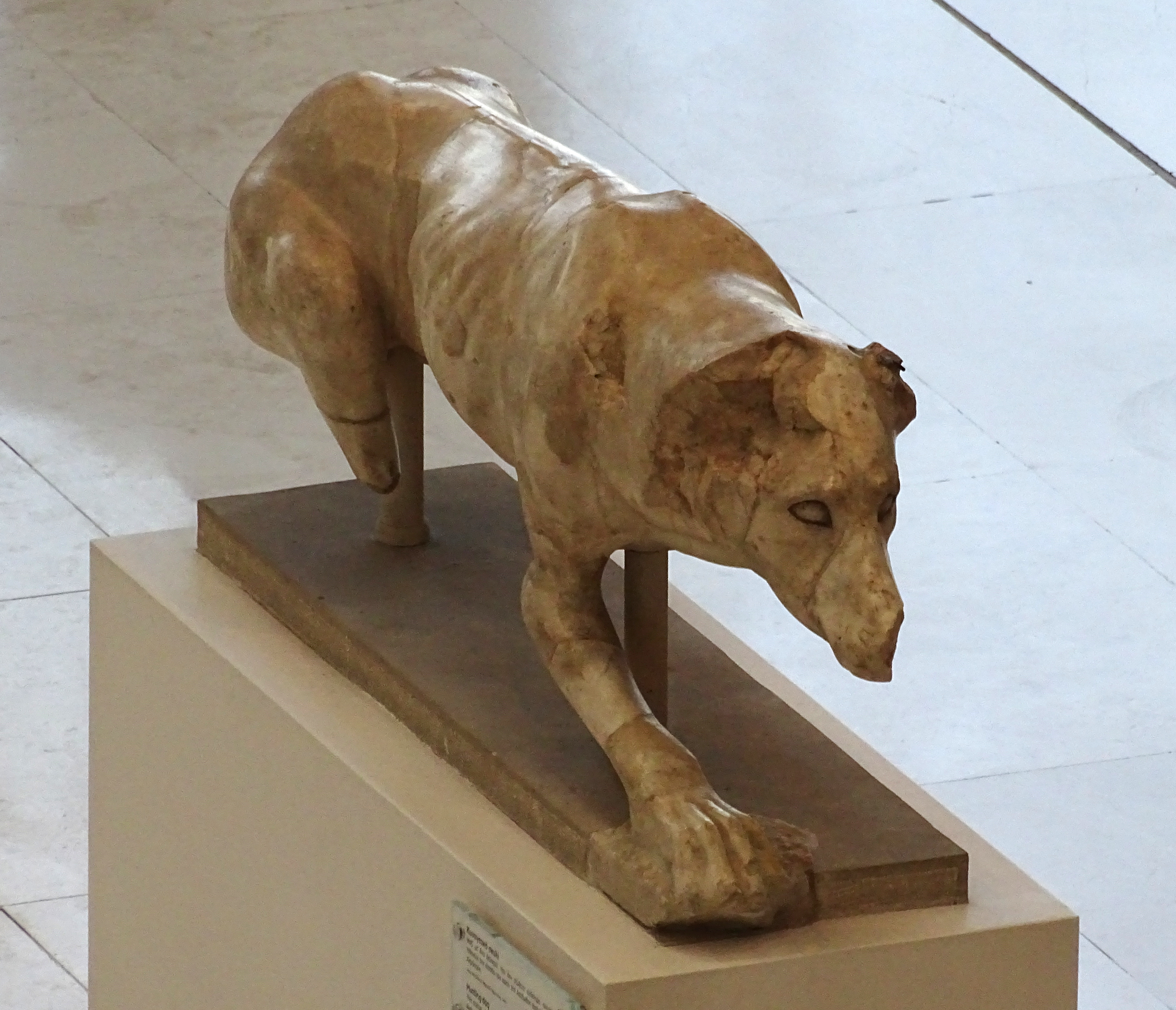
- Statue of a hunting dog with Laconian characteristics found on the Acropolis c. 520 BC
- Other names: Lacedaemonian; Lakonian; Spartan; see more
- Origin: Laconia, Ancient Greece
- Breed status: Extinct
Traits
- Colour: tan with white markings or black with tan markings
- Litter size: 8

The Laconian (Ancient Greek: Λάκαινα, romanized: Lákaina), also known as the Spartan, is an extinct dog breed from ancient Laconia, in Greece. In antiquity, it was famous for its swiftness and keen sense of smell, and typically used for hunting.

Widely depicted in classical art and literature, the breed was about eighteen inches high at the shoulder, typically tawny or black-and-tan, and highly valued for chasing both larger game (such as deer and wild boar) and smaller prey (like hares).

Multiple names were used for the Laconian breed, though their exact usage and relationships remain debated. Some controversy exists with the nature of the relationship between the term Castorian and Laconian, with some scholars considering Castorians a subtype of Laconian, and others considering it only possibly related. There is also some debate on the relationship of the term Vulpine and the Laconian with most scholars regarding the Vulpine as a legitimate designation for the Laconian, either as a variety of the breed or as a possible predecessor.

Several later sources speculate on the legacy of the Laconian. The modern Hellenic Hound has been suggested as a descendant, and some writers link the breed to the origins of several European hunting breeds. Individual dogs such as Alexander the Great's Peritas and Odysseus's Argos have also been proposed as Laconians, while literary references, including Shakespeare's "out of the Spartan kind," have been interpreted in connection with the breed.

== Reputation ==
The Laconian hounds were very swift scent hounds that were renowned and highly valued for their hunting skills. They were depicted in classical sculptures, mosaics, gravestones, coins, vases, and drinking cups.

Contemporary fragments include writers such as classical writers Pindar, Sophocles, Xenophon, Plato, Aristotle, Theophrastus, Nemesianus, as well as later Roman writers such as Virgil, Horace, Plutarch, Petronius, Pliny The Elder, Oppian, and Pollux. Late antiquity writer Claudian and Elizabethan playwright Shakespeare also make allusion to the breed.

== Characteristics ==
Two principal surviving sources describe the breed: Xenophon (c.350 BC) and Aristotle (c.350 BC).

Both sexes gained sexual maturity at eight months old and remained sexually active throughout their lives. Gestation lasted sixty to sixty-three days. Typical litter was of eight pups. Puppies typically opened their eyes after twelve days. On average, the male lived for ten years and the female twelve.

Typically either tan with white markings on the face, throat, chest, legs, and stern or black with similarly placed tan markings.

Based on artistic depictions of the breed, the Laconian was estimated to be about eighteen inches high at the shoulder and weighed between thirty and forty pounds, or roughly the size of a "very large beagle or small harrier."

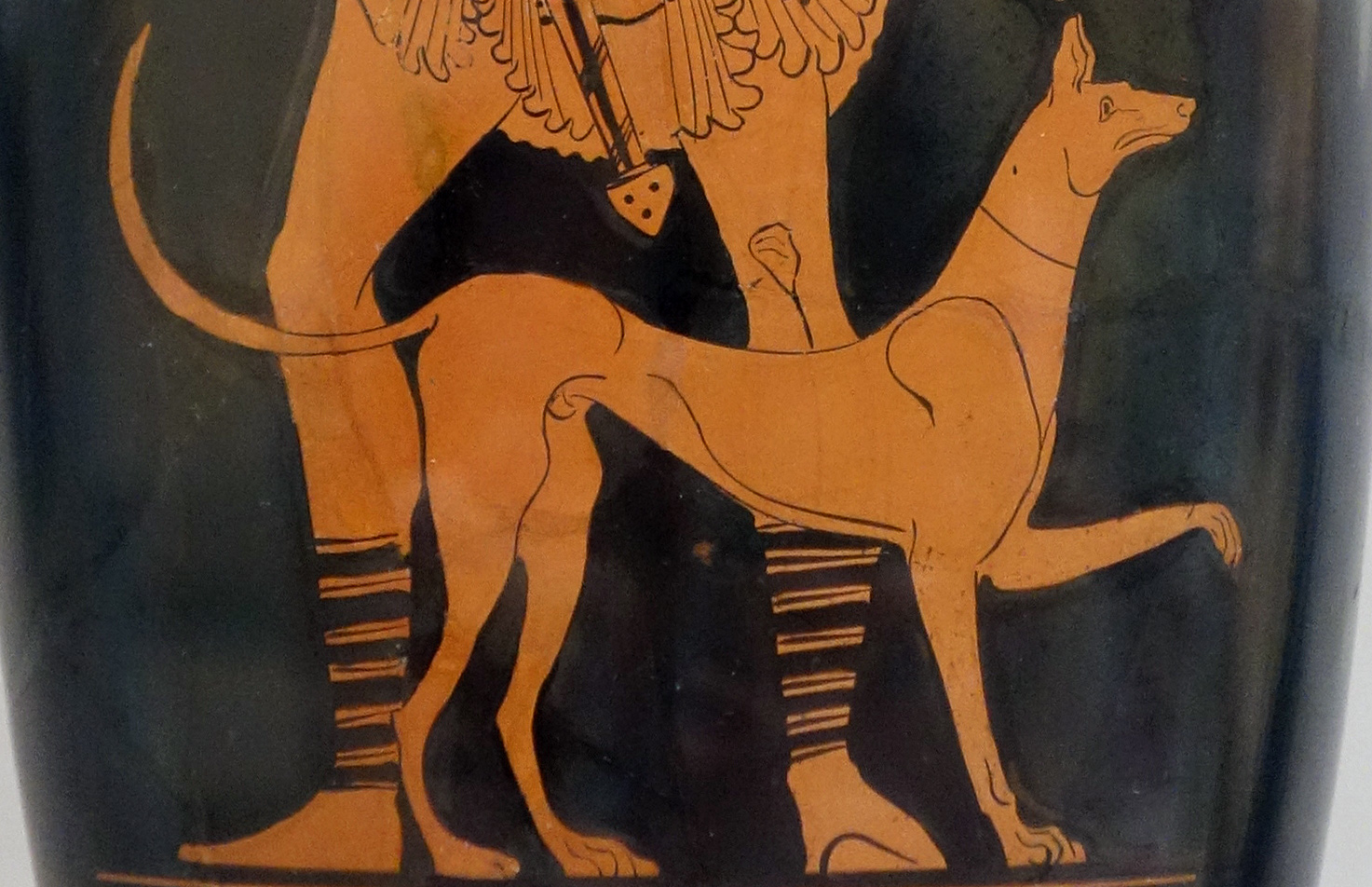
Attic red-figure lekythos of a hunter and a Laconian. Early Classical, c.475–450 BC.

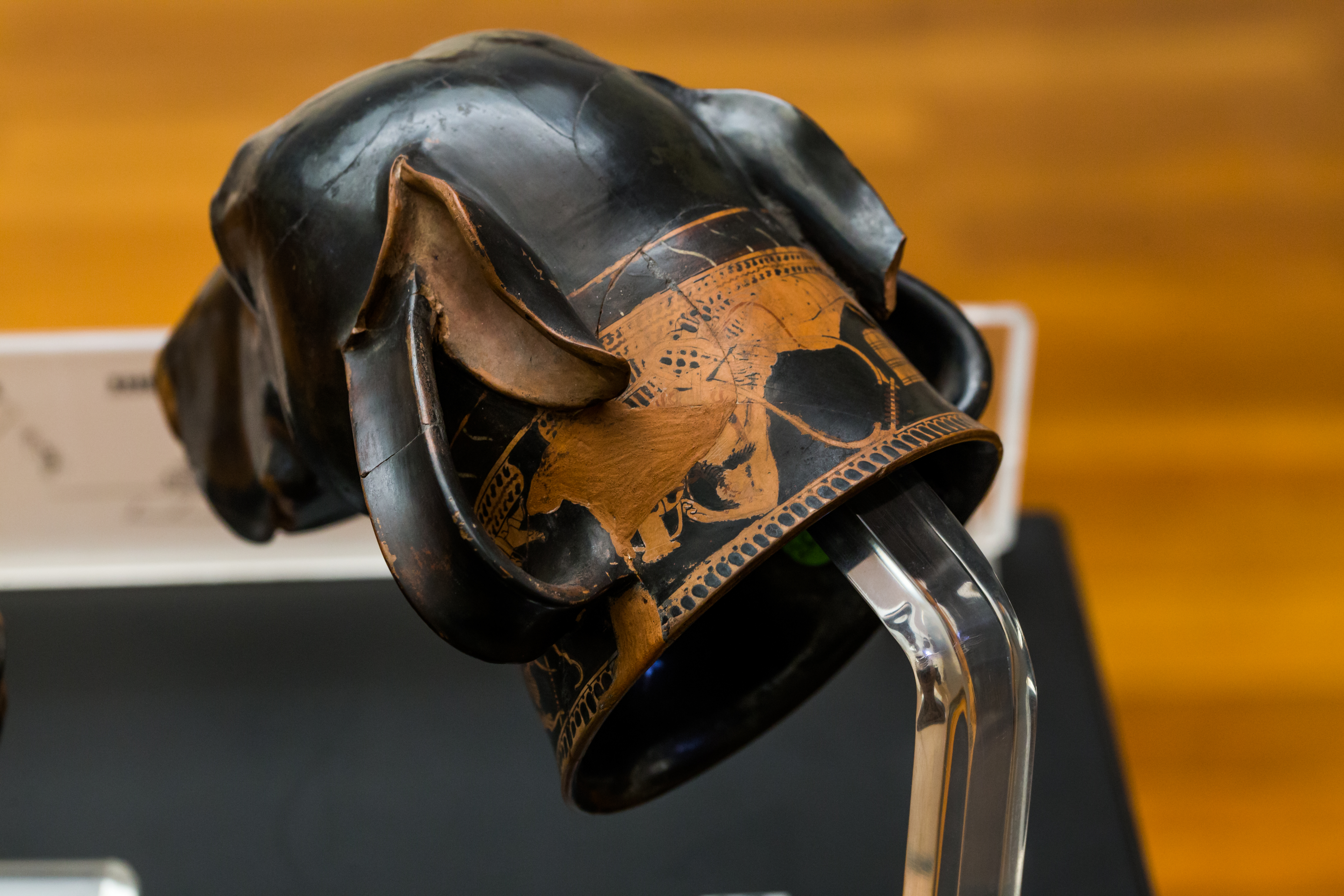
Attic red figure kantharos in the shape of the head of a dog. made in Athens, by Brygos, c.500–475 BC

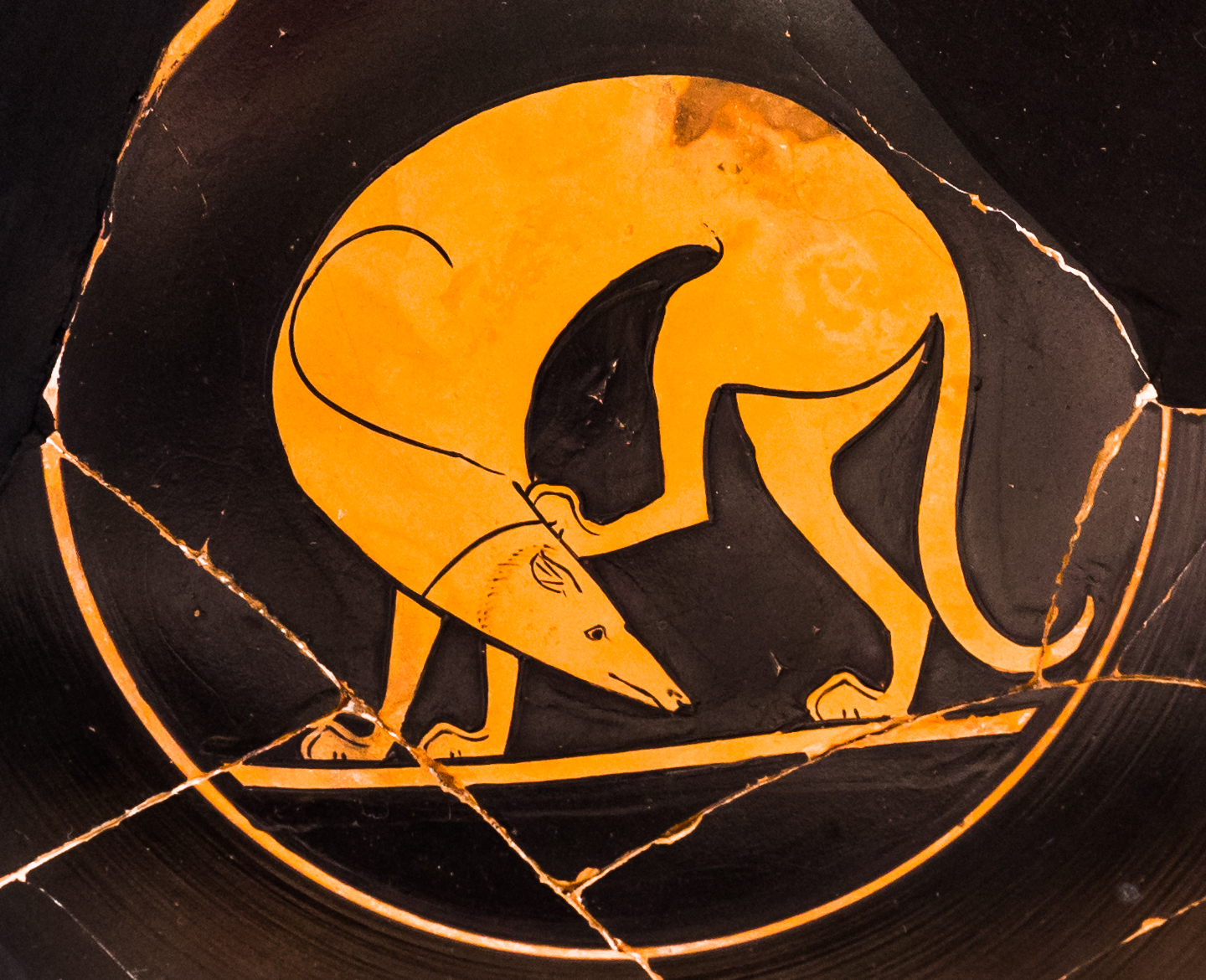
Attic red-figure kylix of a Laconian scratching itself by Euergides, Late Archaic, c. 500 BC.

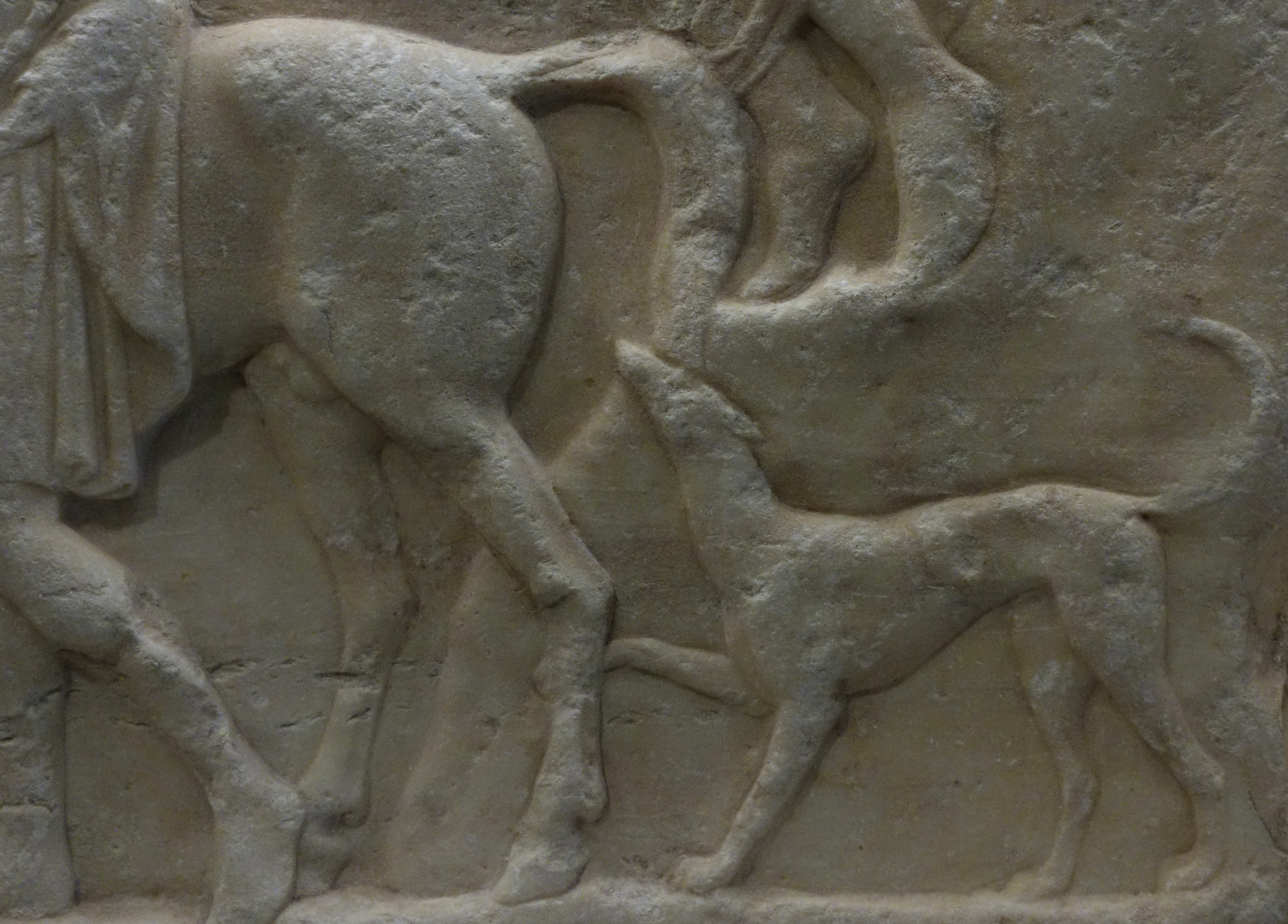
Detail on a votive relief depicting a 'Lakonian' hound accompanying the seated Artemis, c.400 BC

=== Hunting traits ===
Oppian's Cynegetica gives the characteristics and habits for dogs best suited for "the swift chase of the gazelle and deer and swift-footed hare". Xenophon's Cynegeticus covers technical advice on hunting and contains a detailed description of the Laconian.

Both authors agree that for the best hunting dogs, the head should be light with dark eyes with a long neck; ears should be small and thin with little hair; the chest and shoulder blades should be broad with sloping ribs; the forelegs should be shorter than the hind legs; and the tail should be long, straight and prominent. Both recommend selecting larger dogs over their smaller counterparts.

== Appellatives ==
The Laconian is known by several appellatives. There is some scholarly debate over which of the appellatives refer to the Laconian hound.

The term Laconian refers to the region of Laconia in ancient Greece and, when applied to dogs, may denote either a general geographic origin, or, more likely, a specific breed or an "entire family of hounds 'of Laconian pedigree'". The most frequent appellatives are variations on Laconian (Spartan, Lacedaemonian), which were used synonymously.

Appellatives derived from the names of Spartan villages such as Amyclaeus (from Amyclae) or Cynosuran (from Cynosura) may have been used to refer to the same breed but bred in that specific village, or to identify different local variants, though the limited nature of the sources leaves some ambiguity.

Aristotle describes the Laconian as the result of a cross between a dog and a fox. (Note: Margariti notes that Aristotle does not reference the Castorian or the Vulpines but rather describes the Laconian as the offspring of dogs and foxes.) Most scholars agree that Vulpine (Latin for fox-like) is a valid appellative of the Laconian, either as a sub-type of the Laconian breed or to refer to the overall breed of the Laconian.

=== Castorian & Vulpine ===
In his treatise, Xenophon clearly distinguishes the larger Castorian (Note: The Castorian's name was derived from the myth that they were bred from hounds that Castor was said to have received from Apollo. See Xenophon, Cynegeticus.) (Greek: καστορίδες, romanized: kastorides) and the smaller fox-like Vulpine (Greek: ἀλωπεκίδες, romanized: alopekides). Pollux, echoing Nicander of Colophon, in his 2nd Century AD thesaurus Onomasticon, merges the Castorian (Note: Pollux also lists two alternative names for the Castorian: the Menelaid (after Menelaos) and the Harmodian (after Harmodius). (See Pollux Onomasticon Book 5, Chapter 37 or Rajewicz, p.67 and Hull, p.33) Margariti puts forward that since the "only well-known Greek" named Harmodius was one of the Athenian Tyrannicides, the Castorian may not have been "thought of as having exclusively originated in Sparta". or (see Margariti, p.6-7)) and theVulpine. He states that kastorides are alopekides, since he claims that it was Castor himself who crossed dogs with foxes and thus create a new breed.

Most scholars classify both the Castorian and the Vulpine as sub-types of the overall Laconian breed. However, some rebut this view, stating Xenophon does not specify that they are sub-types Laconian, but rather of dogs in general. (Note: Margariti notes that Aristotle makes no meantion of the Vulpine or the Castorian, noting only that the Laconian descends from a cross between a fox and a dog. She also notes that the belief that the two terms are sub-types of Laconians may have come about due to Xenophon's reference to "the Spartan Castor in connection with the Castorians". See Margariti, p.6-7)

Manns and other scholars noted the contradiction between Xenophon and Pollux's observations and theorized that both may be true if either,

1. kastorides and alopekides interbred and, over time, became indistinguishable, or
2. one of the sub-types became extinct.

In contrast, Margariti observes that no Classical sources support Pollux's claim and, since the Onomasticon was compiled several centuries after the Classical period, considers it of limited reliability.

== Speculated Laconians ==
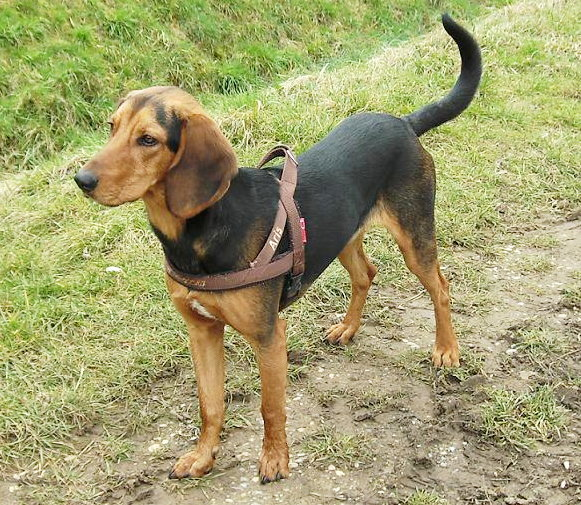
A modern-day Hellenic Hound, speculated to be a descendent of the Laconian dog

=== Speculated descendants ===
It is speculated that the Hellenic Hound may be the modern-day descendant to the Laconian. Both breeds have similar lifespans, litter sizes, and colouring.

Hull speculated that as the Laconian, after losing favor to the greyhound, may have been cross bred with the Segusiae by Bishop of Liege, St. Hubert, to make the hounds of his kennel from which "came the four royal races: the white hounds of the king, the hounds of St. Hubert, the gray hounds of St. Louis, and the fawn hounds of Brittany." From these four lines "came all of the modern tracking hounds—the bloodhound, the basset hound, the beagle, the harrier, and the foxhound."

=== Speculated individuals ===
It has been speculated that Alexander the Great's favourite dog, Peritas, may have been a Laconian.

It has also been theorized that Odysseus's dog Argos may have been a Laconian.

In A Midsummer Night's Dream, Theseus brags: "My hounds are bred out of the Spartan kind [...]", which is interpreted to be an intended reference to the Laconian breed. However the description more closely matches the basset hound, a breed contemporary to Shakespeare.

== See also ==
- List of dog breeds
- List of extinct dog breeds

Virgil, Georgics.
[...] sed una velocis Spartae catulos acremque Molossum pasce sero pingui. Numquam custodibus illis nocturnum stabulis furem incursusque luporum aut impacatos a tergo horrebis Hiberos.
[...] but alike Swift Spartan hounds and fierce Molossian feed On fattening whey. Never, with these to watch, Dread nightly thief afold and ravening wolves, Or Spanish desperadoes in the rear.
Afer agit, tectumque laremque armaque Amyclaeumque canem [...]
The Afric swain bears with him, house and home, Arms, Cretan quiver, and Amyclaean dog;
