= Basset Griffon Vendéen =

Basset Griffon Vendéen may refer to:

- Grand Basset Griffon Vendéen (FCI #33), a small French dog
- Petit Basset Griffon Vendéen (FCI #67), a smaller French dog
