= Basset Hound =

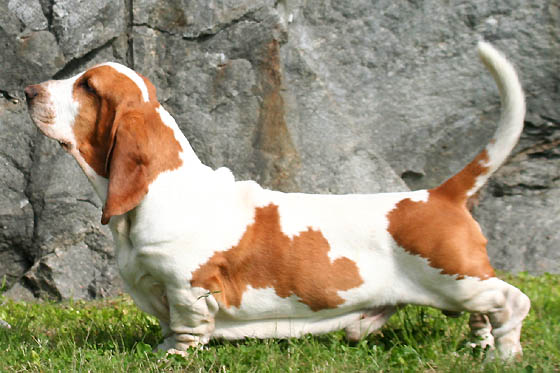
- Tan and white Basset Hound
- Origin: France
Traits
Height	Males	30–38 cm (12–15 in)
	Females	28–36 cm (11–14 in)
Weight	Males	25–34 kg (55–75 lb)
	Females	20–29 kg (45–65 lb)
- Coat: Smooth, short and close
- Colour: Generally black, white and tan (tri-color) or tan/lemon and white (bi-color); but any recognized hound color acceptable.
- Litter size: 6–8 puppies
Kennel club standards
- The Kennel Club: standard
- Fédération Cynologique Internationale: standard

The Basset Hound is a short-legged breed of scent hound. The Basset Hound was developed in Great Britain from several now-extinct strains of French basset breeds. It was bred primarily for hunting rabbit and hare on foot, moving slowly enough that horses were not required. Their sense of smell and ability to ground-scent is second only to the Bloodhound.

Basset Hounds are one of six recognized "basset"-type breeds in France. The name Basset is derived from the French word bas, meaning 'low', with the attenuating suffix -et—together meaning 'rather low'. Basset Hounds are usually bicolours or tricolours of standard hound coloration.

== Description ==
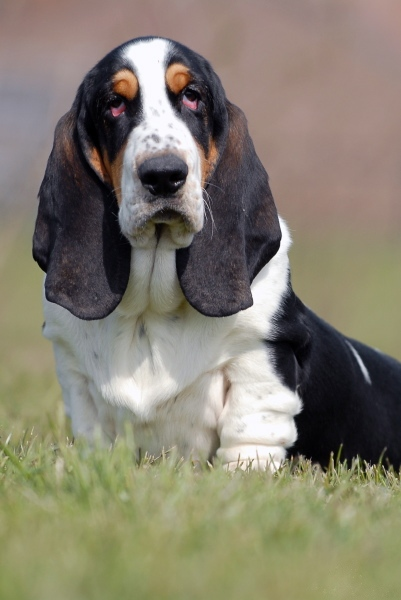
Adult Basset Hound

=== Appearance ===
Basset Hounds are proportionally akin to a large breed dog with short legs. Their slightly-curved tail is held high above their long backs. Size and weight is variable between bloodlines, but weigh between 20 and 35 kg (44 and 77 pounds) on average. This breed, relative to size, is heavier-boned than any other breed.

Similar to the bloodhound, the Basset Hound has wrinkled, loose skin that incites a sad expression. The loose skin around the neck is known as the dewlap. The characteristic long ears help to stir up ground scent. They have slightly crook'd legs that help to support the broad chest and ribs.

The coat is most-often short with coarse hairs under the tail. They come in all hound colors except merle and brindle. The most popular colors tend to be variations in tricolor patterns, but they also come in various shades of red and white.

=== Temperament ===
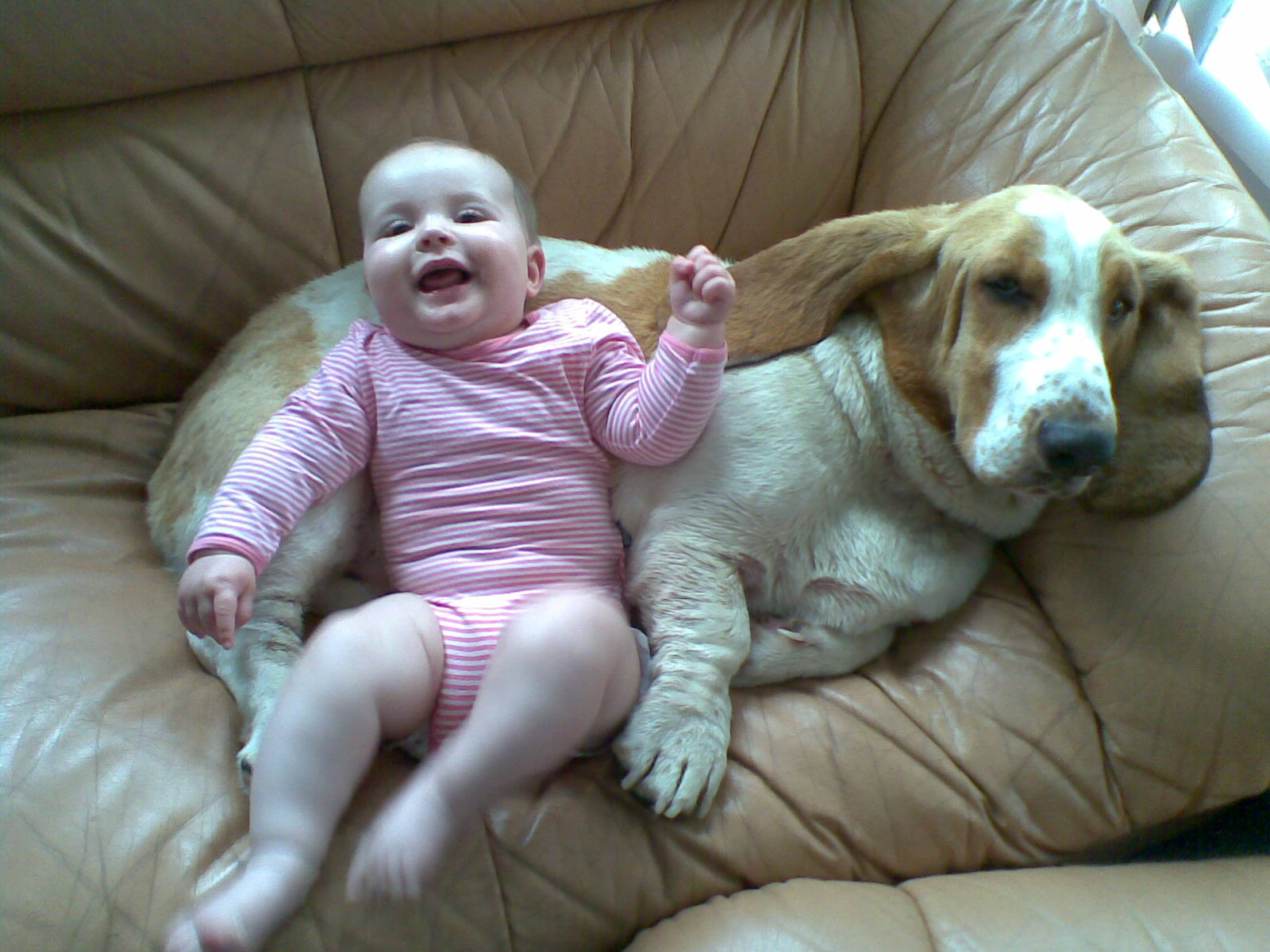
Basset Hounds are renowned for their gentle, docile demeanor.

The Basset Hound is a friendly, outgoing, and playful dog, tolerant of children and other pets. Their temperament is typically mild and extremely devoted, though not timid.

== Health ==
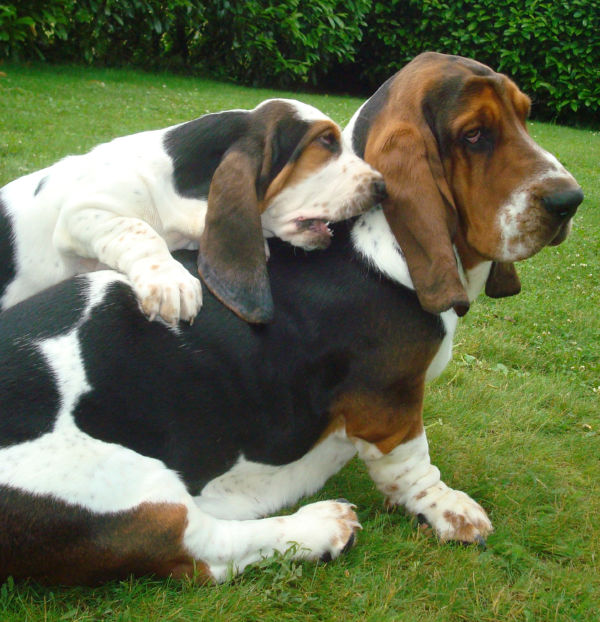
An adult Basset Hound with a puppy on its back

=== Osteochondrodysplasia ===
The Basset Hound's short stature is due to the genetic condition osteochondrodysplasia. Osteochondrodysplasia causes stunted growth and impacts movement. Affected dogs develop splayed hind limbs, enlarged joints, flattened rib cages, shortened and bent long bones, and deformed paws.

=== Life expectancy ===
The breed has a median life span of 10–12 years. A 2015 French study found a life expectancy of 10.3 years. A 2024 study in the UK found a life expectancy of 12.5 years compared to an average of 12.7 for purebreeds and 12 for crossbreeds.

=== Other health issues ===
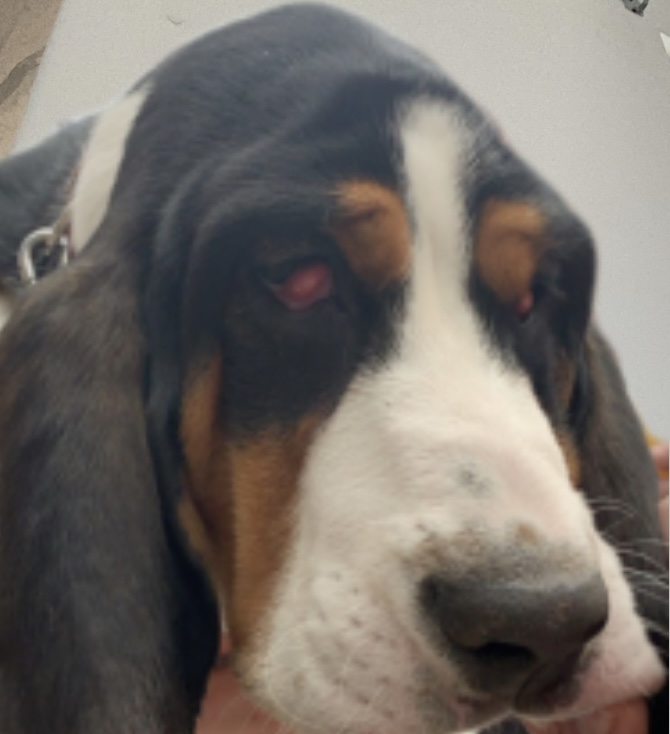
A common eye condition Basset Hounds develop called cherry eye

Basset Hounds are prone to yeast infections.

Leading causes of death in a 2004 UK Kennel Club survey were cancer (31%), old age (13%), gastric dilatation volvulus (11%), and cardiac (8%).

Information from veterinary data found the prevalence of glaucoma to be 5.44%, second highest in the study.

The Basset Hound is predisposed to gastric dilatation volvulus. One study found the odds ratio to be 5.9.

Basset Hound hereditary thrombopathy is an autosomally inherited platelet disorder characterised by a thrombasthenia defect in primary aggregation abnormality of clot retraction. Glycoprotein IIb-IIIa is defective although detectable.

The Basset Hound is prone to several skin conditions: allergic skin disease; intertrigo; Malassezia dermatitis; and otitis, primary keratinization defects.

The Basset Hound is one of the more commonly affected breeds for primary open angle glaucoma. An autosomal recessive mutation of the ADAMTS17 gene is responsible for the condition in the breed.

== History ==
=== St Hubert's Hound ===
The Basset type originated in France, and is descended from the 6th-century hounds belonging to St Hubert of Belgium, which through breeding at the Benedictine Abbey of St. Hubert eventually became what is known as the St Hubert's Hound around 1000 AD. St Hubert's original hounds are descended from the Laconian (Spartan) Hound, one of four groups of dogs discerned from Greek representations and descriptions. These scent hounds were described as large, slow, "short-legged and deep mouthed" dogs with a small head, straight nose, upright ears and long neck, and either tan with white markings or black with tan markings. Laconian Hounds were reputed to not give up the scent until they found their prey. They eventually found their way to Constantinople, and from there to Europe.

=== France ===
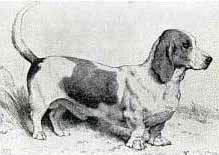
1879 woodcut of Everett Millais' first Basset-type hound named Model, who was imported from France in 1874

The first mention of a "Basset" dog appeared in La Venerie, an illustrated hunting text written by Jacques du Fouilloux in 1585. The name "Basset" has its origins in the Latin word for low, bassus, and the French diminutive -et. The dogs in Fouilloux's text were used to hunt foxes and badgers. It is believed that the Basset type originated as a mutation in the litters of Norman Staghounds, a descendant of the St Hubert's Hound. These precursors were most likely bred back to the St. Hubert's Hound, among other derivative French hounds. Until after the French Revolution around the year 1789, hunting from horseback was the preserve of kings, large aristocratic families and of the country squires, and for this reason short-legged dogs were highly valued for hunting on foot.

Basset-type hounds became popular during the reign of Emperor Napoleon III (r. 1852–1870). In 1853, Emmanuel Fremiet, "the leading sculptor of animals in his day" exhibited bronze sculptures of Emperor Napoleon III's Basset Hounds at the Paris Salon. Ten years later in 1863 at the first exhibition of dogs held in Paris, Basset Hounds attained international attention.

The controlled breeding of the short haired Basset began in France in 1870. From the existing Bassets, Count Le Couteulx of Canteleu fixed a utilitarian type with straight front legs known as the Chien d'Artois, whereas Mr. Louis Lane developed a more spectacular type, with crooked front legs, known as the Basset Normand. These were bred together to create the original Basset Artésien Normand.

=== England ===
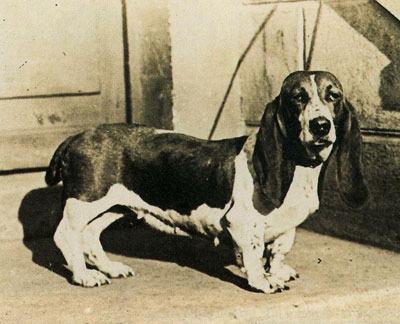
An early 20th century Basset-type hound

French Basset Hounds were being imported into England at least as early as the 1870s. While some of these dogs were certainly Basset Artésien Normands, by the 1880s linebreeding had thrown back to a different heavier type. Everett Millais, who is considered to be the father of the modern Basset Hound, bred one such dog, Nicholas, to a Bloodhound bitch named Inoculation through artificial insemination in order to create a heavier Basset in England in the 1890s. The litter was delivered by caesarean section, and the surviving pups were refined with French and English Bassets. The first breed standard for what is now known as the Basset Hound was made in Great Britain at the end of 19th century. This standard was updated in 2010.

The only Basset Hound to win at Crufts is Antoinette's Hili's Basset hound, Ch. & Eng. Ch. Switherland Sensation At Haven. He also became the first dog from Malta to win Best of Breed at Crufts,. 2004.

== Hunting with Bassets ==
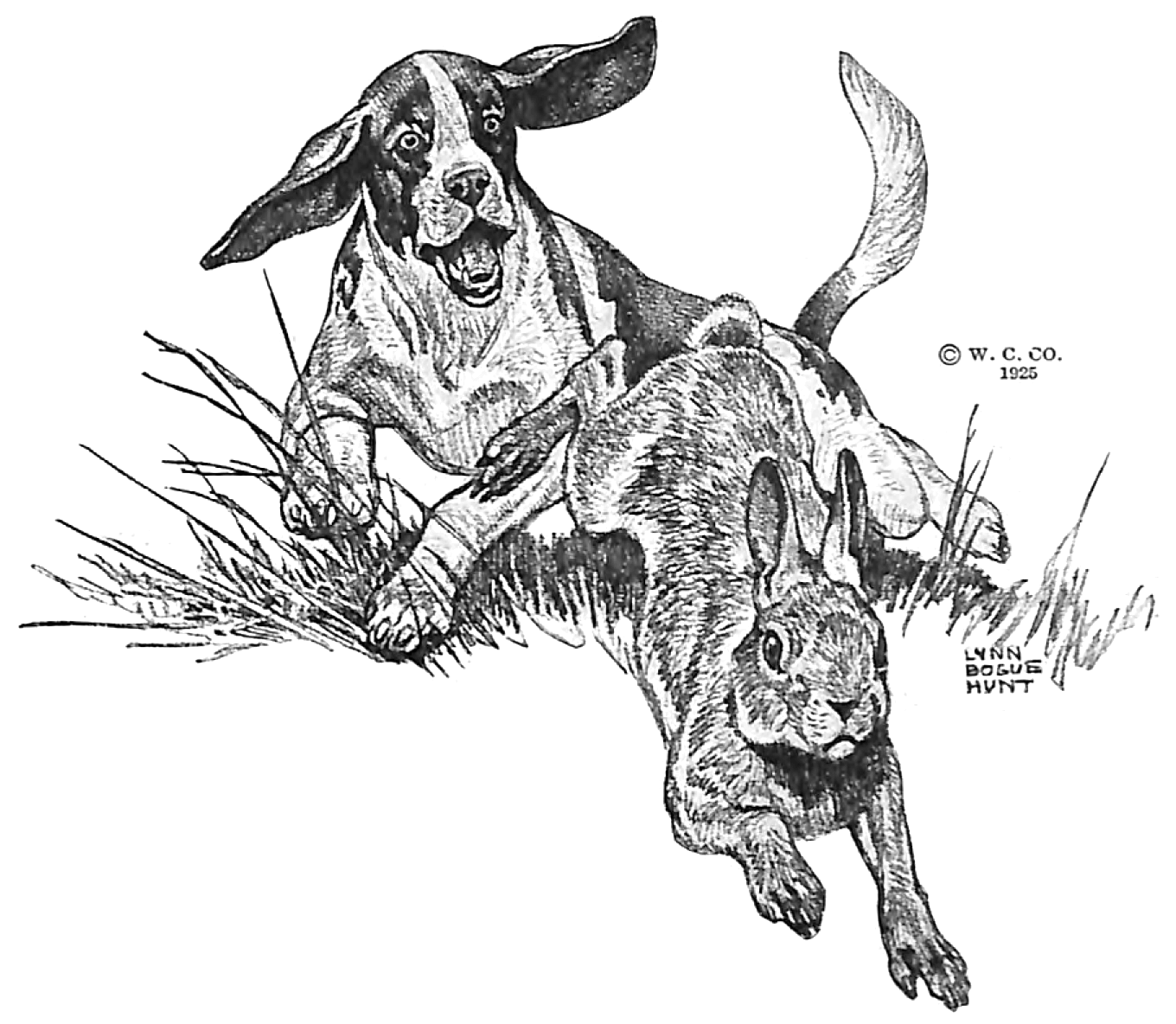
A 1925 illustration of a Basset Hound hunting a rabbit

The Basset Hound was bred to hunt, with a keen nose and short stature suited to small-game hunting on foot. A variety of Basset Hound developed purely for hunting by Colonel Morrison was admitted to the Masters of Basset Hounds Association in 1959 via an appendix to the Stud Book. This breed differs in being straighter and longer in the leg and having shorter ears.

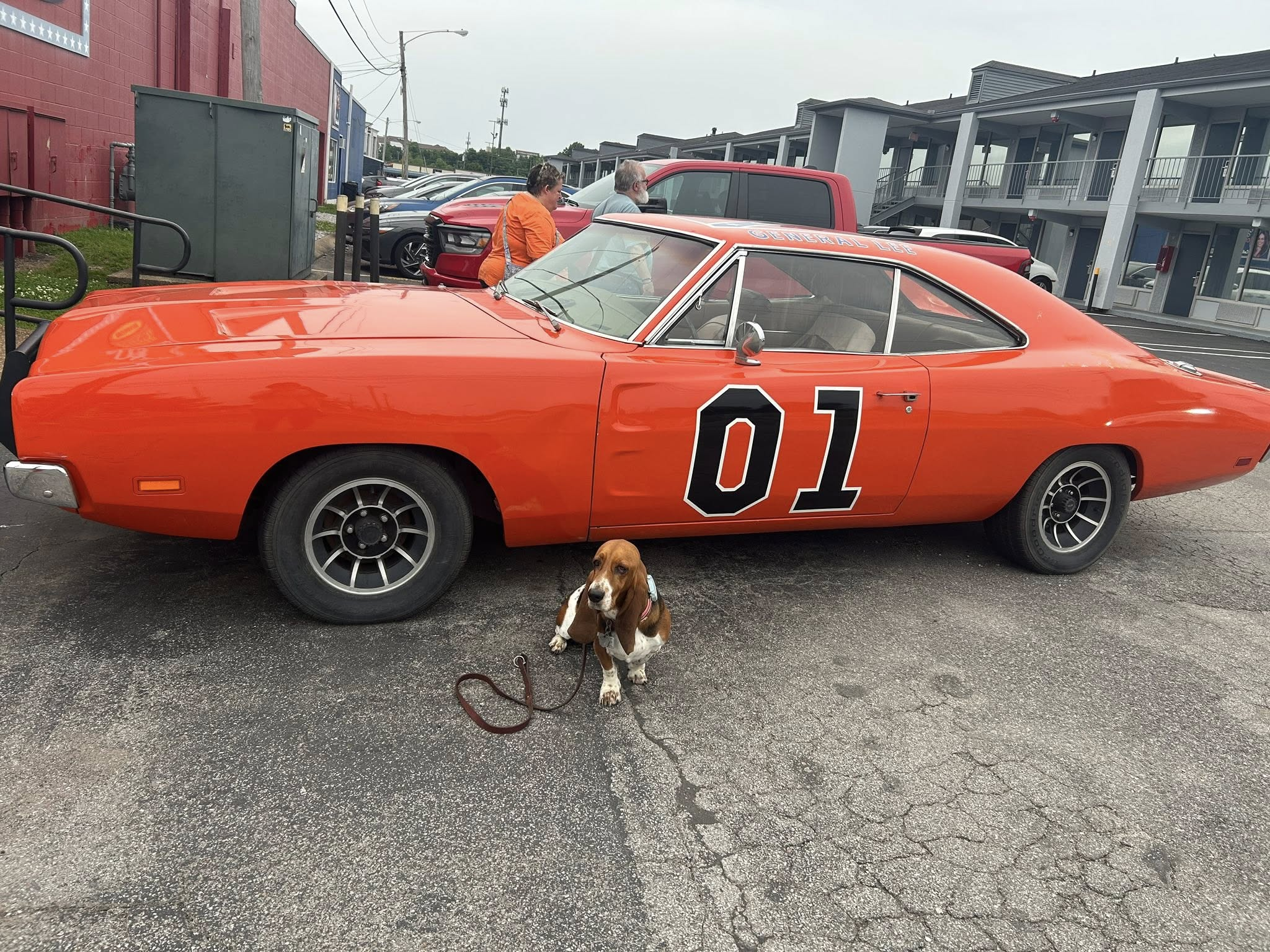
A Basset Hound in front of the General Lee from The Dukes of Hazzard, outside Cooter's Museum in Nashville, TN

== See also ==
- Basset Artesien Normand
- Basset Bleu de Gascogne
- Basset Fauve de Bretagne
- Grand Basset Griffon Vendéen
- Petit Basset Griffon Vendéen
- Bloodhound
