= Basset =

Scenthounds with short legs

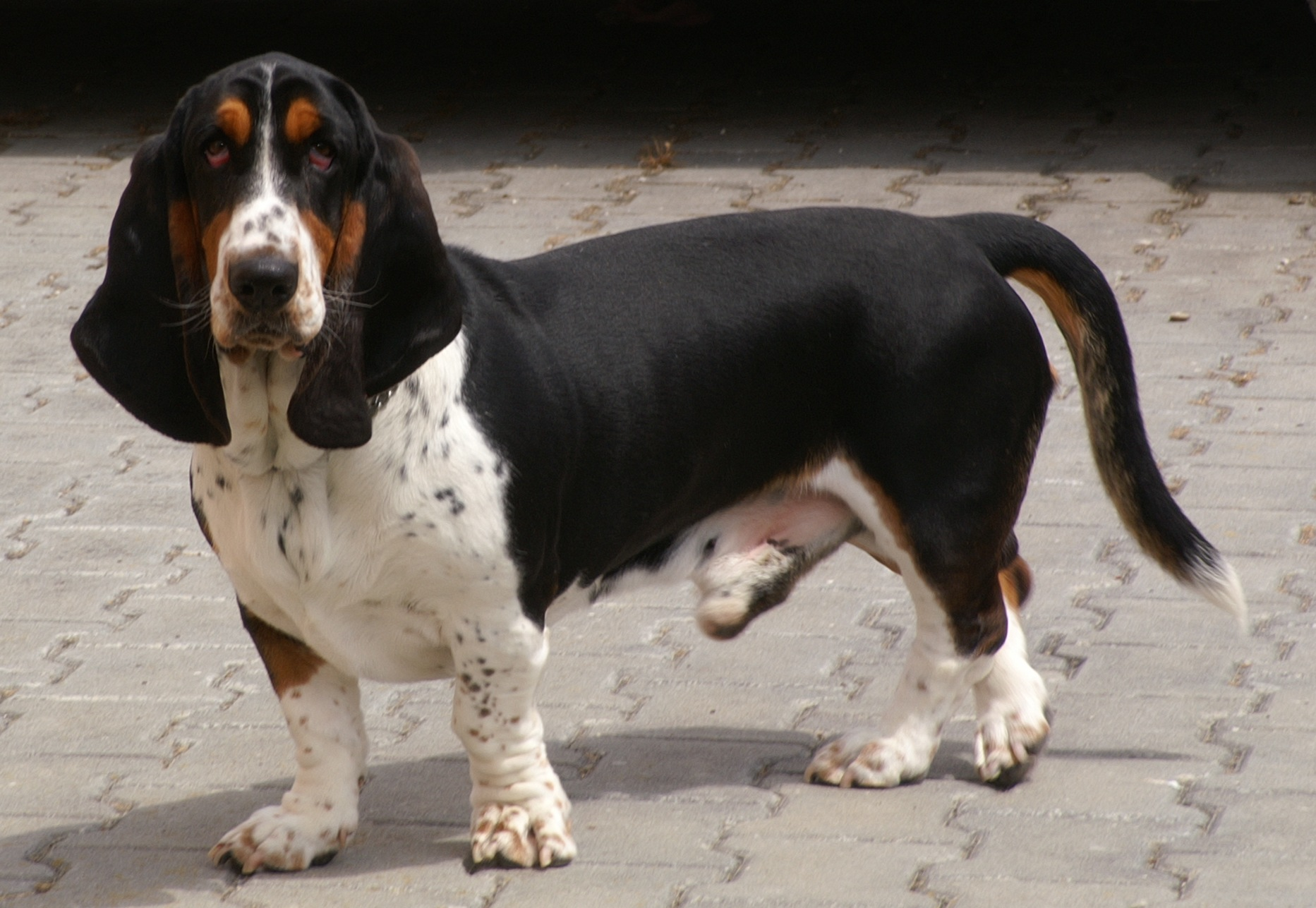
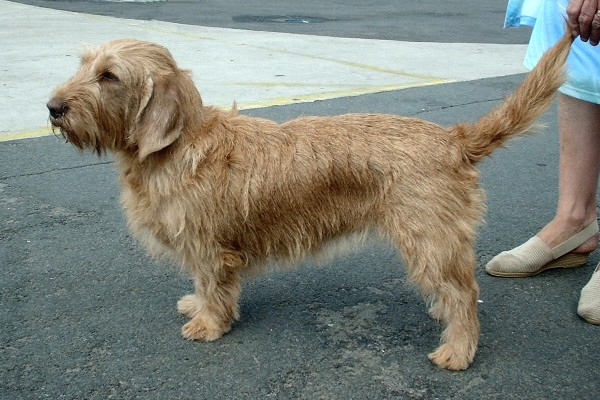
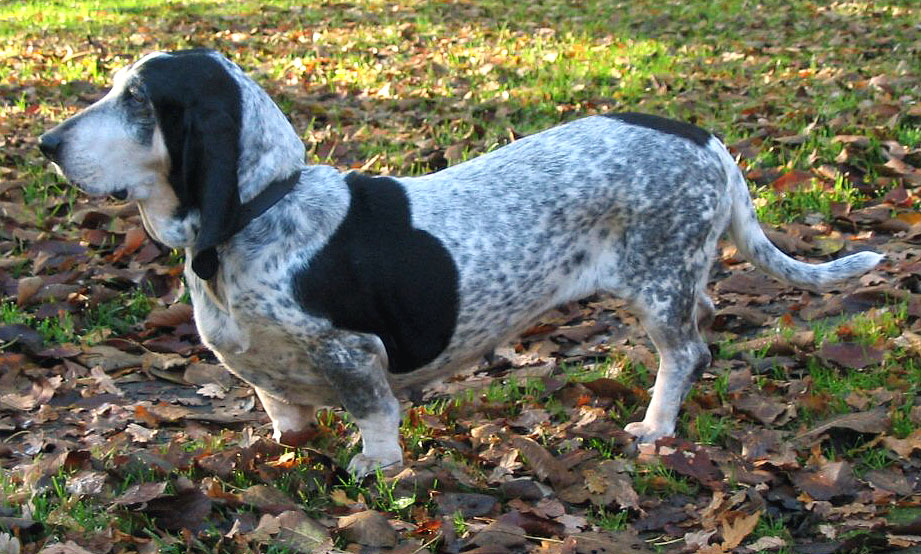
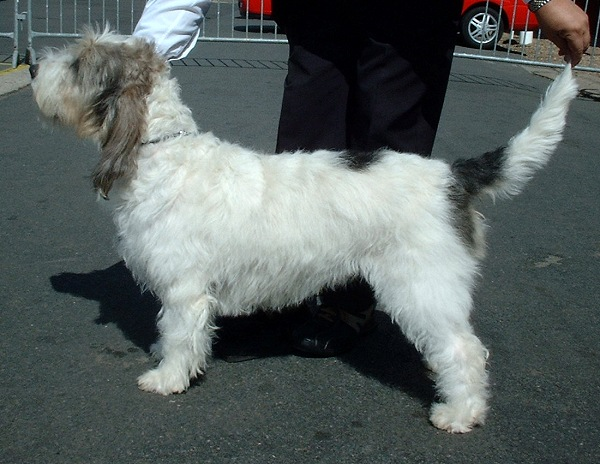

Bassets are a sub-type of scenthound deliberately bred with short legs, that are used for hunting where the hunters accompany the hunting hounds on foot.

== History ==
Bassets were originally developed in France from where they spread throughout Europe and the world. The name basset is derived from the French word bas which means low, a reference to their stature. It is believed bassets were bred from Saint Hubert-type hounds, with breeders taking advantage of a genetic mutation resulting in short legs to develop smaller statured, deep scenting hounds. These short-legged hounds were deliberately bred to allow hunters to accompany the hunting hounds on foot, as opposed to following hunt from horseback; their smaller stature making them slower and so easier to keep up with on foot.

The first description of bassets was in the 16th century by Jacques du Fouilloux in his work La vénerie, stating they were found in the regions of Artois and Flanders. Du Fouilloux described two types of bassets; the first were short-coated with crooked forelegs and were used to hunt above ground as well as to pursue game below ground; the second were often rough-coated with straighter forelegs and only pursued game above ground. Hunting game on foot with bassets experienced a rapid increase in popularity in France after the French Revolution in the late 18th century, when hunting with large hounds from horseback was almost eliminated in France as it was traditionally the preserve of the nobility.

== Description ==
Bassets have a strong resemblance to larger, longer-legged hound breeds, particularly the Bloodhound, despite their much smaller stature. Bassets’ forelegs tend to be either crooked or straight, depending upon the breed; the coat types and colours seen within different basset breeds reflect those seen within the broader scenthound type, with short, long and wiry coats all found.

== Use ==
Bassets hunt in packs and traditionally are used to hunt in two ways; in the first the hounds trail their quarry noisily to waiting hunters with guns who shoot the game; in the second the hounds pursue the quarry until they catch it. Packs of bassets are still used to hunt various quarry, particularly hare and rabbit, but they are also used to flush gamebirds in a manner similar to spaniels.

== Breeds ==
Recognised breeds of basset include the French Basset Artésien Normand, Basset Bleu de Gascogne, Basset Fauve de Bretagne, Grand Basset Griffon Vendéen and Petit Basset Griffon Vendéen and the Basset Hound from Great Britain.

Other non-French origin breeds often considered basset-adjacent include the Alpine Dachsbracke from Austria, the Berner Niederlaufhund, Jura Niederlaufhund, Luzerner Niederlaufhund and Schwyzer Niederlaufhund from Switzerland, the Drever from Sweden, and the Westphalian Dachsbracke from Germany.

== See also ==
- Beagling
