= Basset Bleu de Gascogne =

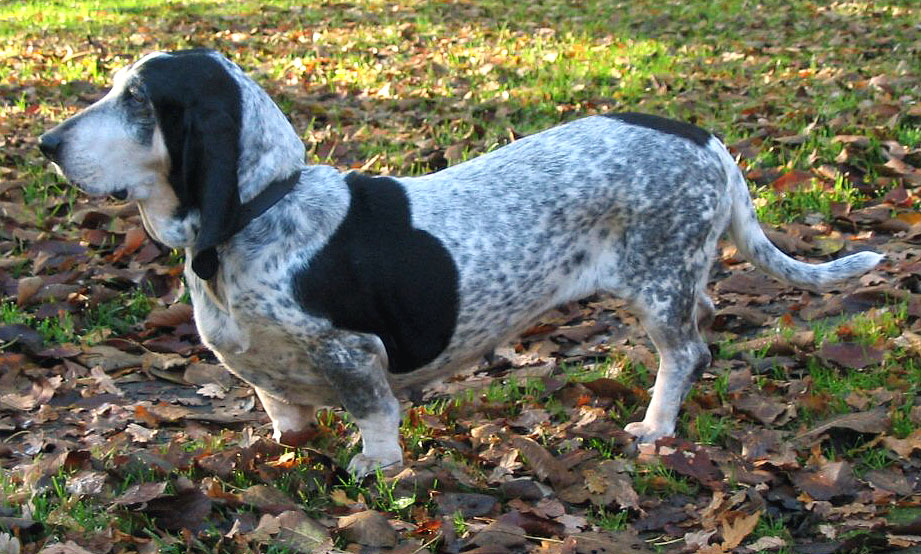
- A Basset Bleu de Gascogne
- Other names: Blue Gascony Basset; Bleus de Gascogne
- Origin: France
Traits
- Height: 34–38 cm (13–15 in)
- Coat: short, dense
- Colour: mottled black and white
Kennel club standards
- Société Centrale Canine: standard
- Fédération Cynologique Internationale: standard

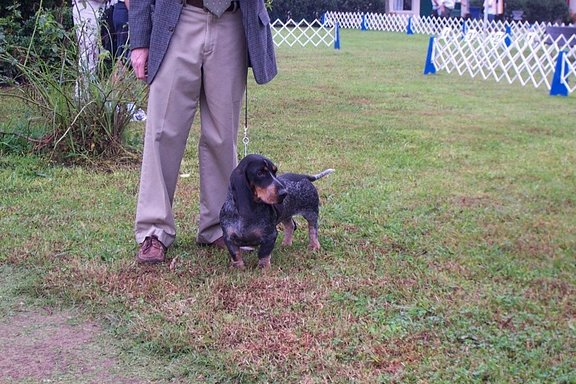
A Basset Bleu de Gascogne with its owner.

The Basset Bleu de Gascogne (French pronunciation: [bɑsɛ blø də ɡasˈkɔɲ]), also known as the Blue Gascony Basset, is a long-backed, short legged breed of dog of the hound type. A French native breed, it is rare outside its homeland. It is recognized internationally by the Fédération Cynologique Internationale, in the UK by The Kennel Club, and by the United Kennel Club in the United States. The "bleu" of its name is a reference to its coat which has a ticked appearance.

== Description ==
=== Appearance ===
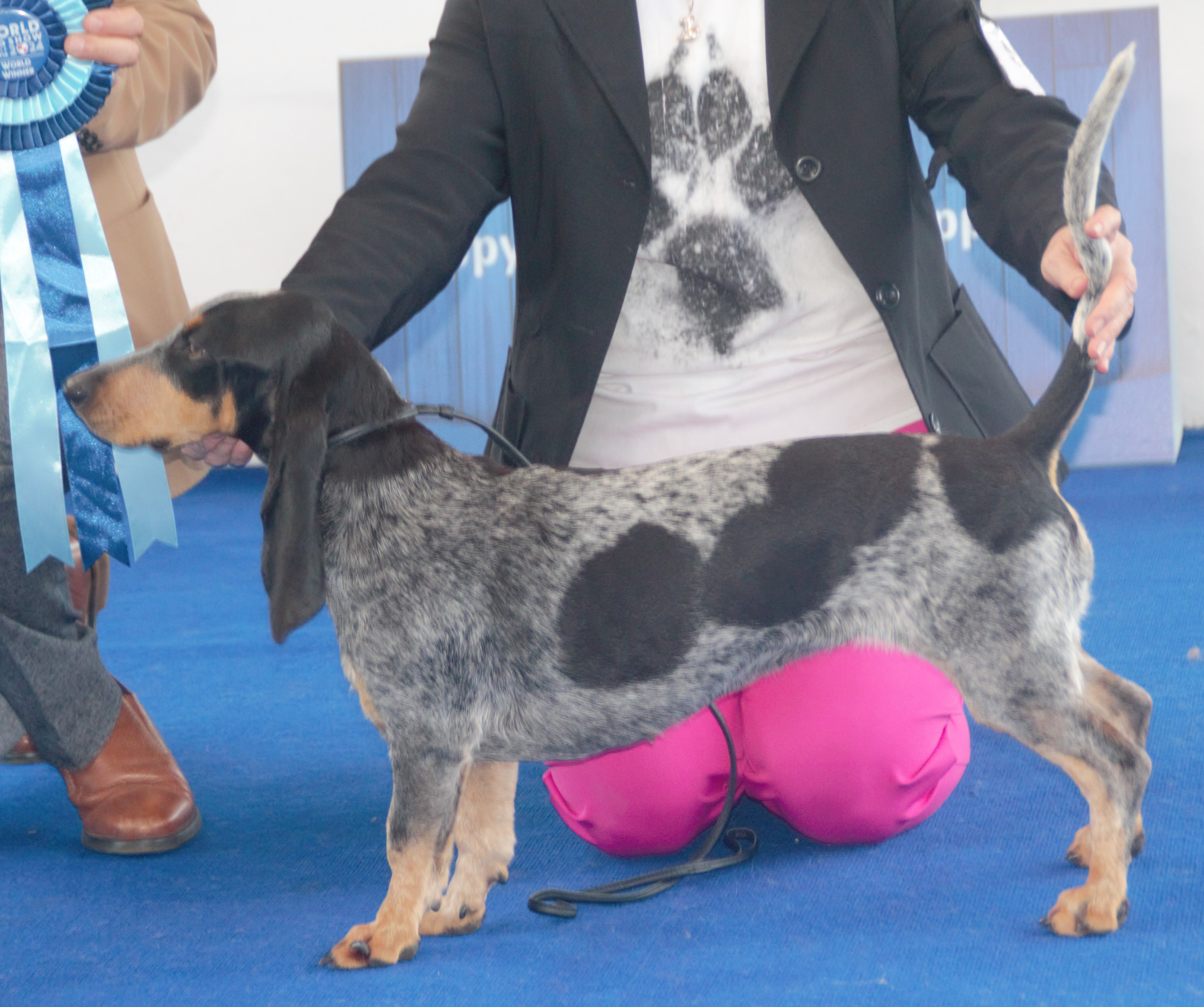
A Basset Bleu de Gascogne in 2024.

The color of their coat is predominantly white, ticked so as to give a bluish appearance, with brown spots and tan markings above the eyes and on the ears. They are a smooth-coated breed. Height at the withers is usually between 34 and 42 centimetres (13 and 17 in) although the Kennel Club standard specifies 30–38 centimetres (12–15 in). Their general appearance is usually not too heavy, and they weigh between 16 and 18 kilograms (35 and 40 lb). They have dark brown eyes and low-set ears that can reach at least the end of their muzzle.

== History ==
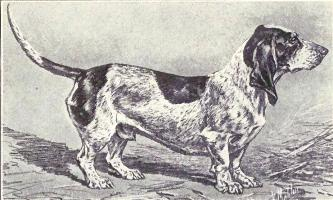
A drawing of a Basset Bleu de Gascogne from 1915.

Originating in the Middle Ages, the Basset Bleu de Gascogne descended directly from the old breed of Grand Bleu de Gascogne. It is thought that Gaston III of Foix-Béarn kept a pack of these dogs to hunt wild boar and wolves. He is known as the writer of the Livre de chasse, considered the classic treatise on medieval hunting.

During the early 19th century the breed nearly became extinct with a declining popularity in hunting. However, the breed was saved and revived by the work of Alain Bourbon.

== Recognition and categorisation ==
The Kennel Club of the UK recognizes the Basset Bleu De Gascogne in the imported breed register and in the Hound Group. The United Kennel Club recognised the breed in 1991, and both they and the Fédération Cynologique Internationale (FCI) list the Basset Bleu De Gascogne in the Scenthound Group. The breed is also known as the Blue Gascony Basset in the FCI. Today, the Basset Bleu is one of six types of "basset"-type breeds recognised by the FCI. The Basset Bleu De Gascogne is not recognized by the American Kennel Club or the Canadian Kennel Club. In addition to the major registries, the Basset Bleu De Gascogne is also recognized by many minor registries and specialty registries, including as a rare breed under the American Rare Breed Association which uses the FCI standard.

== See also ==
- List of dog breeds
- Basset Hound
- Basset Fauve de Bretagne
- Grand Basset Griffon Vendéen
- Petit Basset Griffon Vendéen
- Basset Artésien Normand
