= Basset Artésien Normand =

Dog breed

Basset Artésien Normand (Norman Artesian Basset)
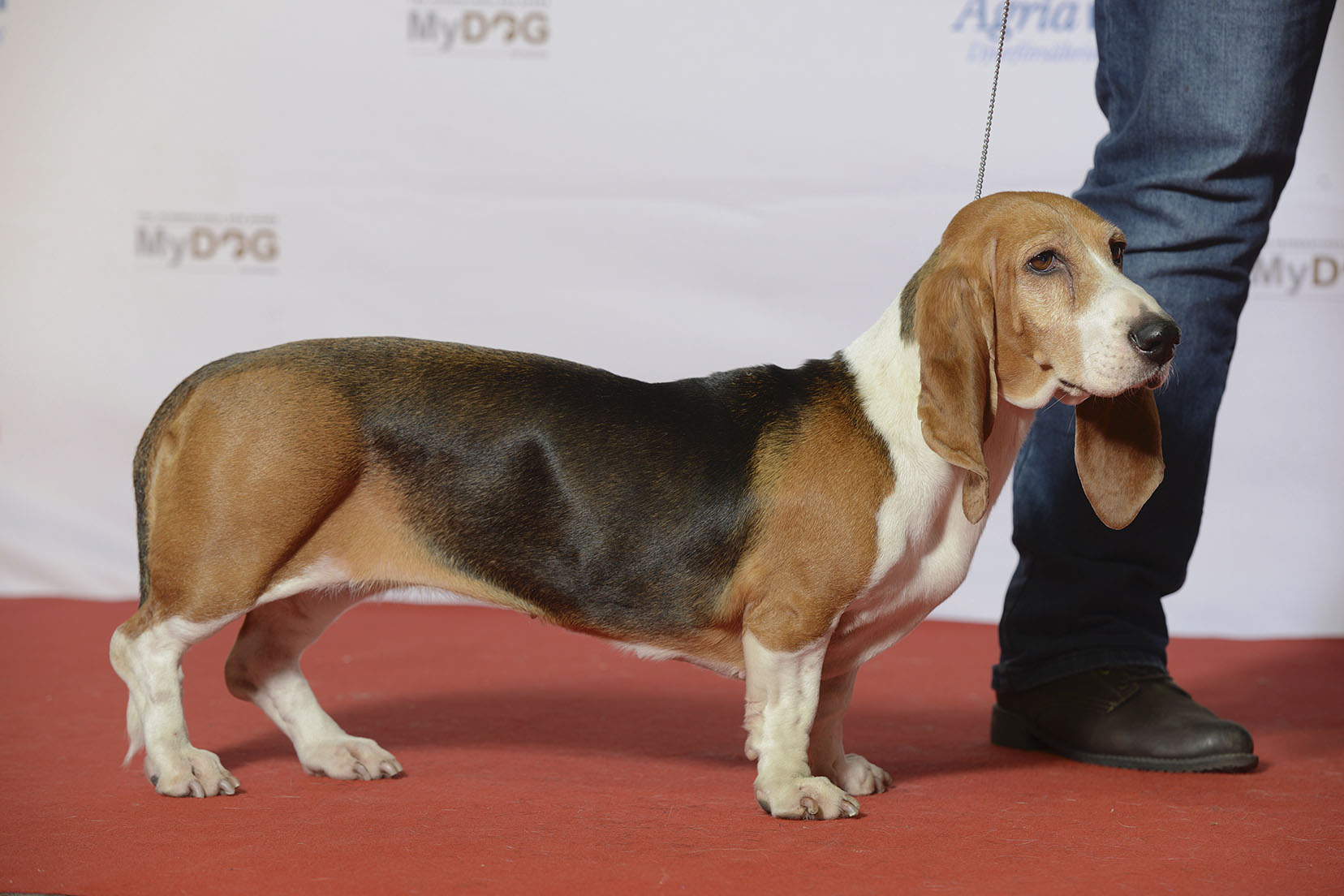
- Basset Artésien Normand
- Common nicknames: BAN
- Origin: France
Traits
- Height: 30–36 cm (12–14 in)
- Weight: 15–20 kg (33–44 lb)
- Coat: short
- Colour: fawn, black and white; fawn and white
Kennel club standards
- Société Centrale Canine: standard
- Fédération Cynologique Internationale: standard

The Basset Artésien Normand (Norman Artesian Basset) is a short legged hound type dog developed in France. The word basset refers to short-legged hounds.

== History ==
The Basset Artésien Normand and the more familiar Basset Hound share a common ancestry in the short-legged hounds of northern France of the early 19th century that displayed osteochondrodysplasia dwarfism. But unlike the Basset Hound, which was developed by English breeders in the late 19th century as a more substantial dog that was initially cross-bred with Bloodhounds, the Basset-type dogs that French breeders developed remained lighter-boned and more focused on hunting ability.

Documenting of these French Bassets as a purebred breed began in 1870, and from a common ancestral type, two strains were developed. One had straight front legs (Basset d'Artois) and the other had crooked front legs (Normand). The breed club was formed in 1910 and the breed was given its present name in 1924.

Bassets are walking hounds, which are followed by the hunter on foot. The short legs mean that they would not get too far away from the hunter. The Basset Artésien Normand was used to hunt rabbits and other small game alone or in packs, but today they are primarily bred to be pets.

== Appearance ==
The height of the Basset Artésien Normand is between 30 and 36 cm (12 and 14 in), with a ratio of the height to the body length of about 5 : 8. Weight is roughly 17 kg (37 lb). The coat is short and tricolored (fawn and white with black blanket, a patch across the back) or bicolored (fawn and white). The head and long ears are distinctive, and the temperament should be calm and good-natured.

== Recognition ==
The original breed club is the Club français du Basset Artésien Normand & du Chien d'Artois, and the breed is recognised by the Fédération Cynologique Internationale (FCI) as breed number 34 in Group 6, Scenthounds. The Basset Artésien Normand is one of six types of "basset"-type breeds recognised by the FCI. It is also recognised by the United Kennel Club (US) in the Scenthound Group.

== See also ==
- List of dog breeds
- Basset Hound
- Basset Bleu de Gascogne
- Basset Fauve de Bretagne
- Petit Basset Griffon Vendéen
- Grand Basset Griffon Vendéen
