= Griffon Nivernais =

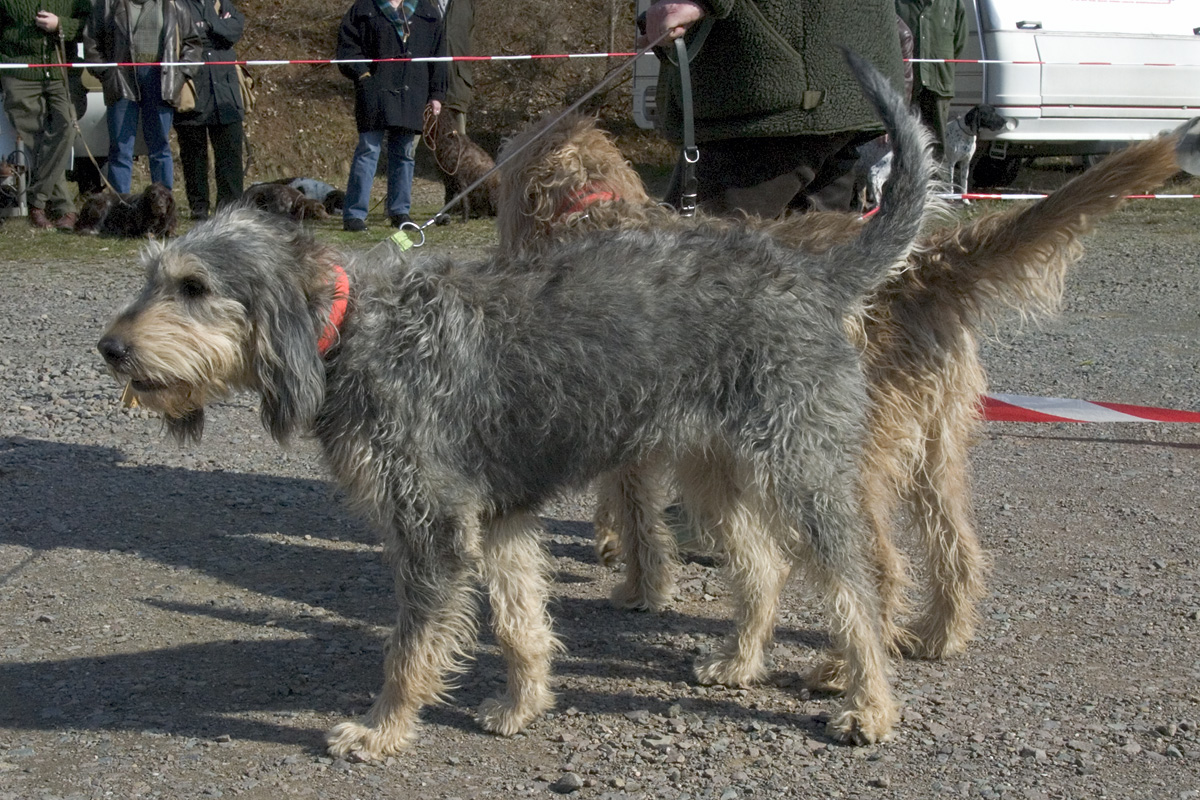
- Griffon Nivernais
- Origin: France
Kennel club standards
- Société Centrale Canine: standard
- Fédération Cynologique Internationale: standard

The Griffon Nivernais is a breed of dog of the scenthound type, originating in France. It is a versatile hunting dog, used on small and large game, in packs or individually. Today's breed is a reconstruction of an ancient type of dog from the Nivernais region.

== Appearance ==
The Griffon Nivernais is a medium-sized dog, 55 to 60 cm (21.7-23.6 ins) at the withers, with a distinctive rough (shaggy) coat, long drop ears, and a long tail carried up and in a slight curve. The body is longer than most French hounds, and is constructed more for endurance than for speed. As a reconstructed breed, the breed standard goes into much more detail with regard to body proportions, structure, and coat than is usual for a working dog.

Colour of the coat is grizzled in general appearance, gris clair to gris sanglier, light grey to boar grey. The coat is agouti, with each hair darker at the base than the tip. White hairs are scattered through the coat. Colours are fawn very slightly overlaid with black (poil de lièvre, hare coat), sable overlaid with black (gris loup, wolf grey), and fawn overlaid with blue (gris bleu, grey blue). There may be a small white spot on the chest.

== History ==
The Griffon Nivernais was a breed kept by French noblemen which disappeared after the French Revolution. The breed was reconstructed beginning in 1925, by some hunters in Morvan, modeling on the ancient types that came to Europe with the Crusaders and the type called "Canes Segusii" or the Celtic Hound by early dog writers. The original dogs were used to hunt wolves and wild boar in the fourteenth century, and were much larger than the modern-day breed. The reconstruction of the breed was done based on the Grand Griffon Vendéen. Other breeds used were the Otterhound and Foxhounds. The breed was small in number for many years, but is now experiencing a revival.

== Health and temperament ==
No unusual health problems or claims of extraordinary health have been documented for this breed. The breed's ideal temperament is described in the breed standard as being courageous, and it is also described as obstinate and independent. Temperament of individual dogs may vary.

== See also ==
- List of dog breeds
- Anglo French and French Hounds
- Dog terminology
- Griffon Bleu de Gascogne
