= Stag Hunt Mosaic =

Ancient Greek mosaic signed "Gnosis"

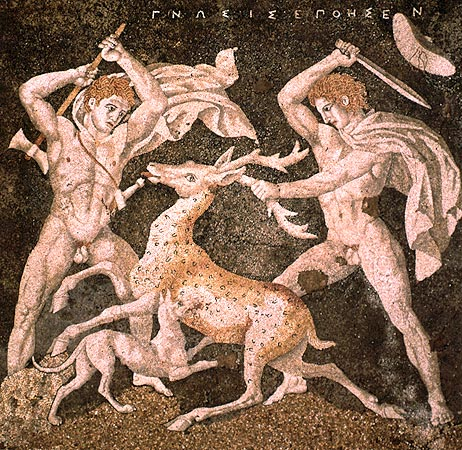
The emblema of the Stag Hunt mosaic.

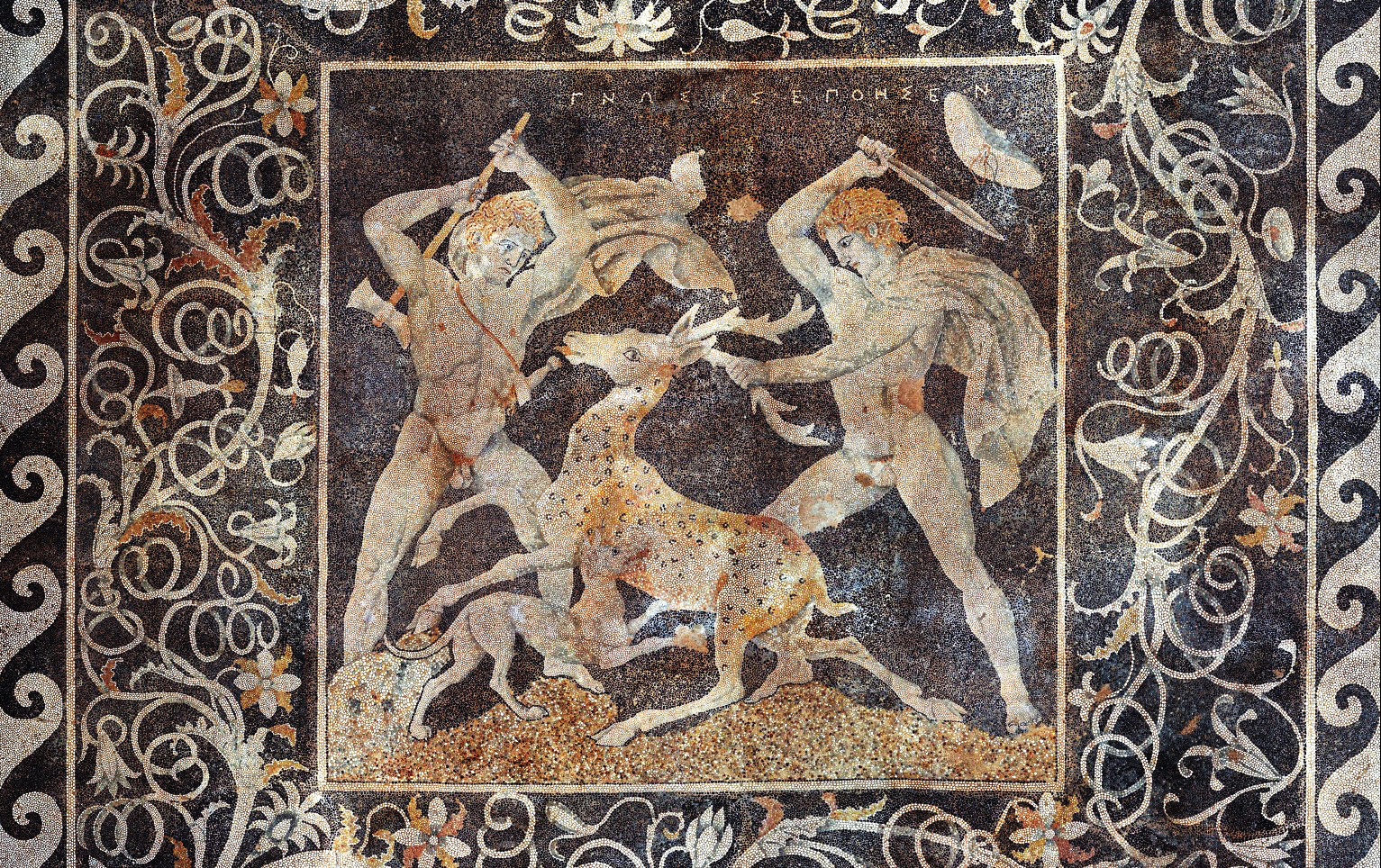
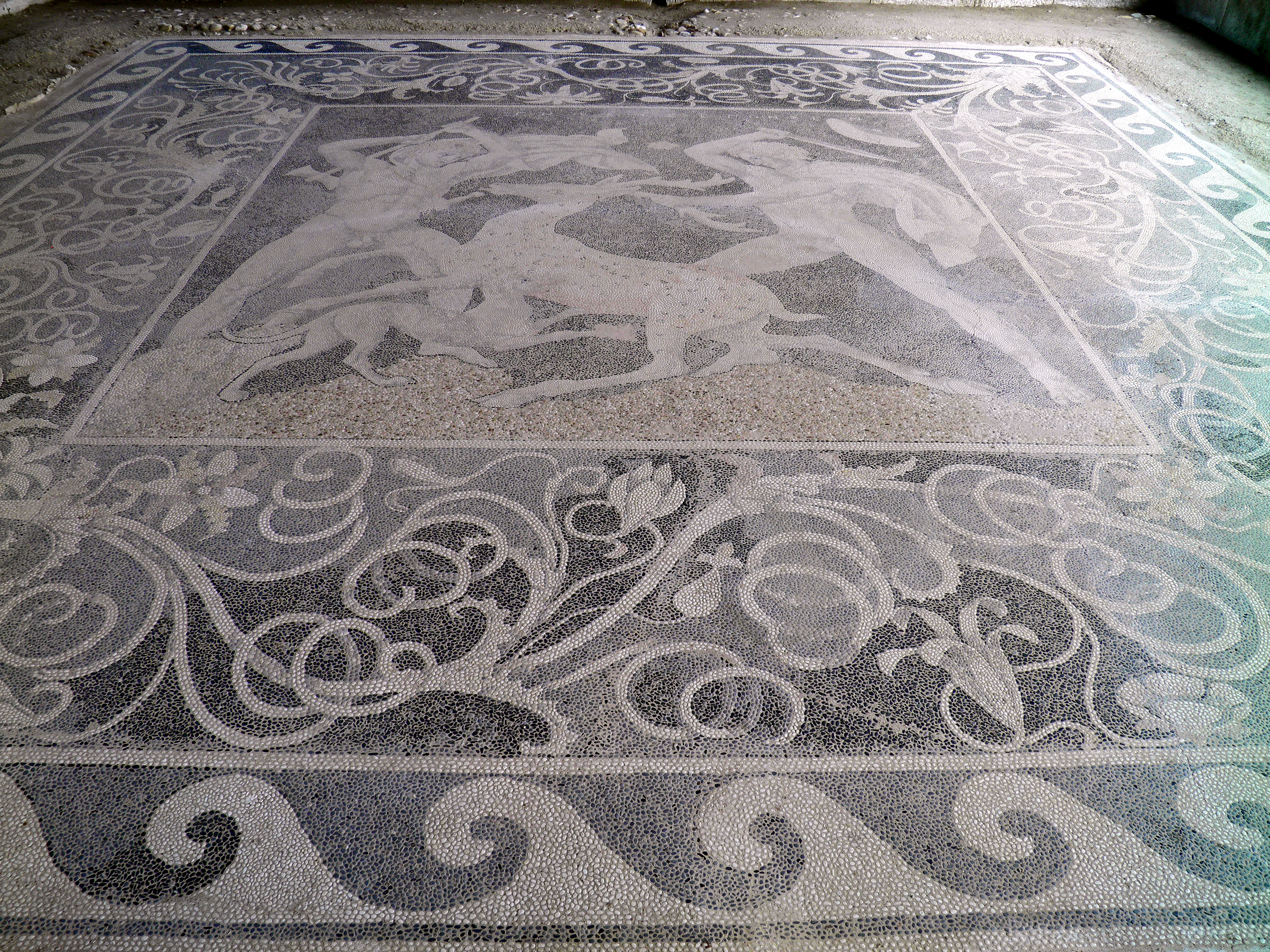
The floor mosaic as it was discovered in Pella; the figure on the right is possibly Alexander the Great due to the date of the mosaic along with the depicted upsweep of his centrally-parted hair (anastole); the figure on the left wielding a double-edged axe (associated with Hephaistos) is perhaps Hephaestion, one of Alexander's loyal companions.

The Stag Hunt mosaic (c. 300 BC) is a mosaic from a wealthy home of the late 4th century BC, the so-called "House of the Abduction of Helen" (or "House of the Rape of Helen"), in Pella, the capital of the Macedonian Kingdom. It bears the signature of the Ancient Greek artist Gnosis, of whom very little is known. It is now located in the Archaeological Museum of Pella, Central Macedonia, Greece.

== Composition ==
The emblema is bordered by an intricate floral pattern, which itself is bordered by stylized depictions of waves. The mosaic is a pebble mosaic with stones collected from beaches and riverbanks which were set into cement. As was perhaps often the case, the mosaic does much to reflect styles of painting. The light figures against a darker background may allude to red figure painting. The mosaic also uses shading, known to the Greeks as skiagraphia, in its depictions of the musculature and cloaks of the figures. This along with its use of overlapping figures to create depth renders the image three dimensional.

It is often wondered if Gnosis, whose signature ("Gnosis epoesen", i.e., Gnosis created) is the first known signature of a mosaicist, could have been the painter of an earlier picture which the mosaic reproduces, rather than the mosaic-setter. In the case of pottery, 'epoesen' referred to a maker of the pot, while 'egraphsen' was the verb used to designate the painter. Therefore, if an analogy to pottery is warranted, it seems likely for Gnosis to have been a mosaicist. Since gnosis (Greek: γνῶσις) is also the Greek word for knowledge, others have said the inscription does not refer to an author at all but to an abstract noun.

== The figures ==
The figure on the right is possibly Alexander the Great due to the date of this mosaic along with the depicted upsweep of the hair. Pella is also the birthplace of Alexander. The figure to the left wields a double-headed axe, likely alluding to Hephaistos; meaning the figure depicted could be the general Hephaestion. The dog depicted is possibly Peritas accompanying Alexander. The stag and hound may allude to the myth wherein Artemis transforms the huntsman Actaeon into a stag when he tries to rape her. Once he is turned into a stag, his own hounds turn on him, and he is torn apart. The theme of abduction may relate the mosaic not only to the Rape of Helen by Theseus, depicted in another mosaic in the same house, but also to Alexander's conquest of Persia. As Actaeon had hunted Artemis but was destroyed by his dogs, so the Persians had tried to subdue Hellas - an effort earlier Macedonian kings had participated in - resulting ultimately in the empire's destruction by Alexander.

== Deer in Greek mythology ==
In Greek mythology, the stag is associated with Artemis who was the virgin huntress. The myth goes that when Actaeon saw Artemis naked, out of anger she turned him into a stag and he was torn to pieces by his own hounds. In other accounts it is thought that Actaeon tried to rape Artemis. In this image we see the same concept of a stag being torn apart by a dog, just as in the myth as well as by Alexander the Great on the right. It is speculated who is on the left. The theme here is the "hunter being hunted". It is quite fitting mosaic for The House of The Abduction Of Helen, who was raped.

The stag also represents the Persians that Alexander would later conquer. He had stated his motives for battling the Persians as to get vengeance for them sacking Athens and destroying temples there, such as the Parthenon. This would again represent the idea of the hunter being hunted.
