= Gnosis (artist) =

Signature on an ancient Greek mosaic

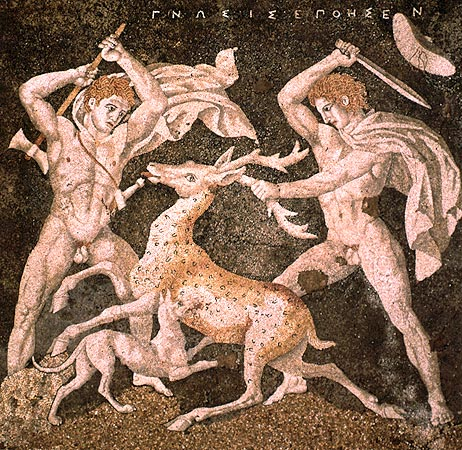

Gnosis (Greek: Γνῶσις), active c. 300 BC, is the name of the artist signed upon the famous Stag Hunt Mosaic from the 'House of the Abduction of Helen' in Pella, capital of the Macedonian Kingdom. It is the first known signature ("Gnosis epoesen", i.e. Gnosis created) of a mosaicist and the only artist name surviving on a pebble floor. It is not known whether Gnosis was the mosaic-setter or the painter of the picture which the floor composition probably reproduces. It is also not known if he was a local or an immigrant artist to the Macedonian court. In the Pella mosaics for the first time use is made of the size of the pebbles and new materials such as semi-precious stones or glass tesserae.
