= Peritas =

Dog owned by Alexander the Great

Detail of the mosaic “House of the Abduction of Helen” at Pella, Greece. Dating of the piece has caused some to believe the dog depicted is Peritas

Peritas (Greek: Περίτας) was Alexander the Great's favorite dog, who accompanied him during his military exploits.

== History ==
=== The eponymous city ===
Not much is known of the historical Peritas aside from a city named in his honor. Like Alexander's horse Bucephalus, Peritas was awarded a city named in his honor, with a monument to his glory in its central square. According to Plutarch, after recalling the story of Bucephalus, "It is said, too, that when he lost a dog also, named Peritas, which had been reared by him and was loved by him, he founded a city and gave it the dog's name." The city was probably somewhere in Pakistan, perhaps not far from the town named after Bucephalus, since both cities would have been the spoils of war for Alexander after having defeated King Porus at the Battle of the Hydaspes.

=== Dog type ===
What type of dog the mythical Peritas was, is hard to ascertain and remains unknown. Peritas is sometimes referred to as a Molossus, or a Bulldog, perhaps from the fierce nature of a few stories. Peritas may also have been a Laconian, a classic ancient Greek hunting dog, as depicted in the Stag Hunt mosaic.

=== Tales of Peritas ===
According to Pliny, it was the king of Caucasian Albania who delighted Alexander by giving him a dog which had attacked and beaten both a lion and an elephant. There is also the story of Alexander meeting Sophytes, a ruler of an area probably around Jech Doab in Punjab. Sophytes gave Alexander one hundred and fifty dogs known for their fearsome strength and courage. Wishing to test their strength, Sophytes had a lion fight two of the weakest dogs. He released two others to help once those two seemed at a disadvantage. The four were doing well against the lion when Sophytes sent a man with a scimitar to hack at a leg of one of the dogs. Alexander protested strongly, and guards took the man with the blade away, until Sophytes offered Alexander three dogs for that one. The dog then calmly accepted its fate without making a sound, and continued to have a firm bite on the lion until it had succumbed to its loss of blood. It is unlikely that any of these pertain to Peritas.

== In popular culture ==
Peritas appears as a posthumous character in Scoob!. He is depicted as a Great Dane who is an ancestor of Scooby-Doo. His bond with Alexander the Great sealed the gates to the Underworld to keep Cerberus from escaping.

The dog is present in the first half of Mary Renault's novel The Persian Boy.

== See also ==
- List of individual dogs
