= Grand Griffon Vendéen =

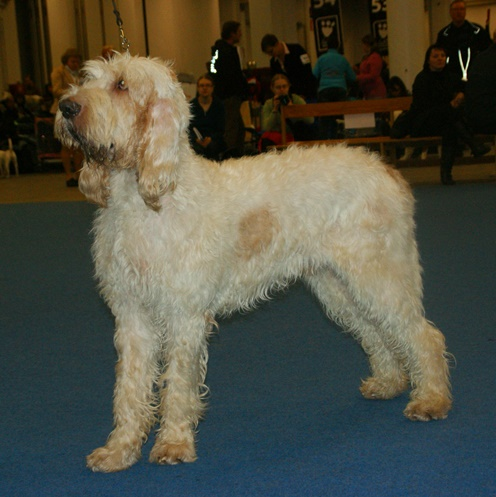
- A Grand Griffon Vendéen.
- Other names: Large Vendéen Griffon
- Origin: France
Traits
Height	Males	62–68 centimetres (24–27 in)
	Females	60–65 centimetres (24–26 in)
Kennel club standards
- Société Centrale Canine: standard
- Fédération Cynologique Internationale: standard

The Grand Griffon Vendéen is a breed of hunting dog originating in France. It was the first of the Vendée griffons to be bred from the Greffier whose lineage dates back to the 16th century. There are also several other breeds of Griffons from Vendée, all of them being smaller: the Briquet Griffon Vendéen, and the Grand and Petit Basset Griffon Vendéen. Related Griffon breeds include the Griffon Fauve de Bretagne, the Griffon Bleu de Gascogne and the Griffon Nivernais.

== Appearance ==
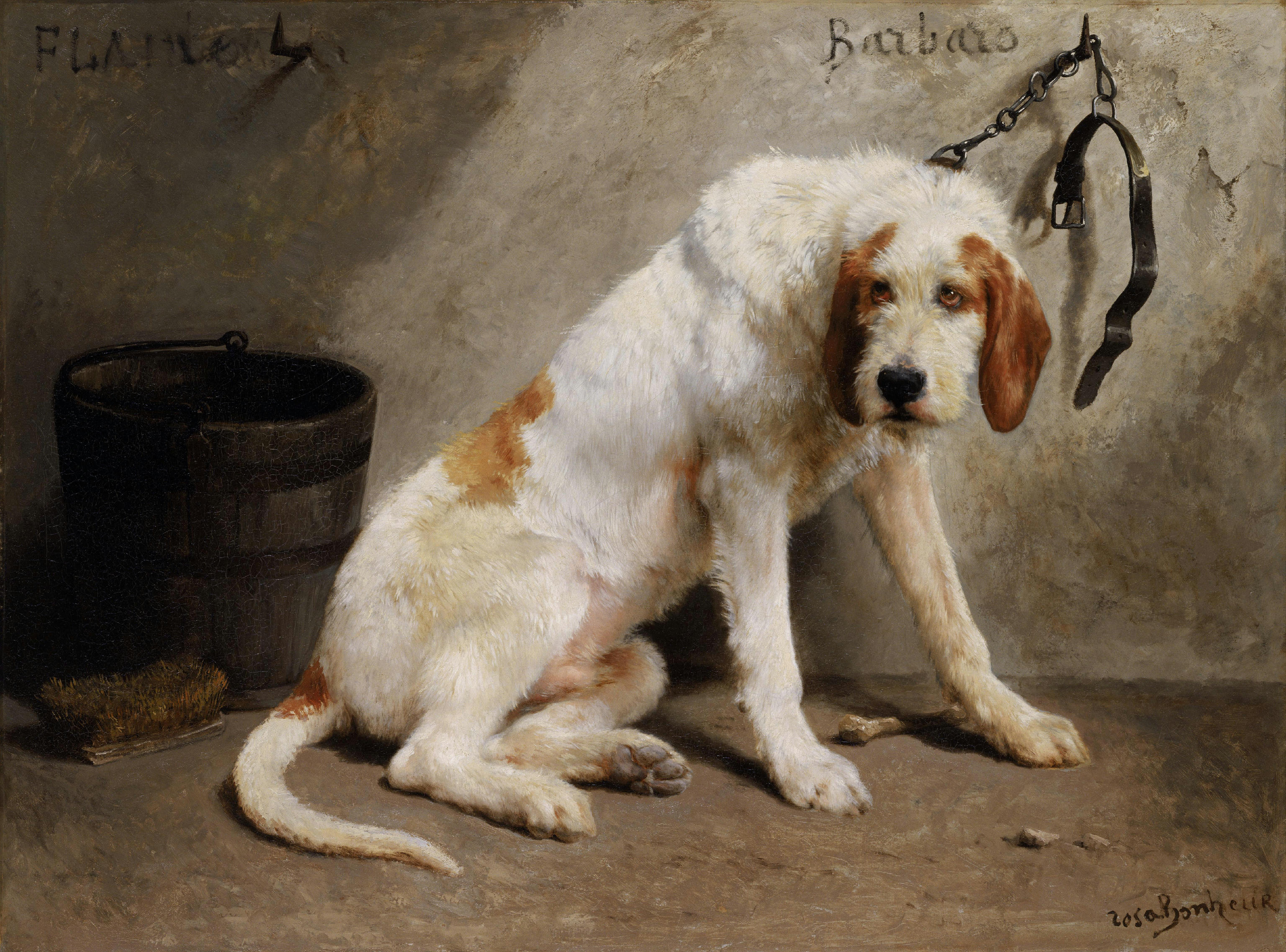
A 19th-century painting of a Grand Griffon Vendéen

The Grand Griffon Vendéen is a large breed of dog. Dogs stand from 62–68 centimetres (24–27 in) and bitches stand from 60–65 centimetres (24–26 in). They have a long, harsh coat and a dense undercoat.

The head is well domed with a slightly defined stop. The nose must be black except for when the coat is white and orange, then a brown pigmentation may be permitted. Lips are covered in a moustache.

The Grand Griffon Vendéen comes in a variety of colours, including white and orange or orange spotting, black with tan markings, black with light tan markings, fawn with white spotting, fawn with black mantle and white spotting, fawn with black overlay, pale fawn with black overlay and white spotting, and pale fawn with black overlay. Select variants are traditionally known as hare colour, wolf colour, wild boar colour, and badger colour.

== See also ==
- List of dog breeds
