= Griffon Fauve de Bretagne =

Griffon Fauve de Bretagne Fawn Brittany Griffon
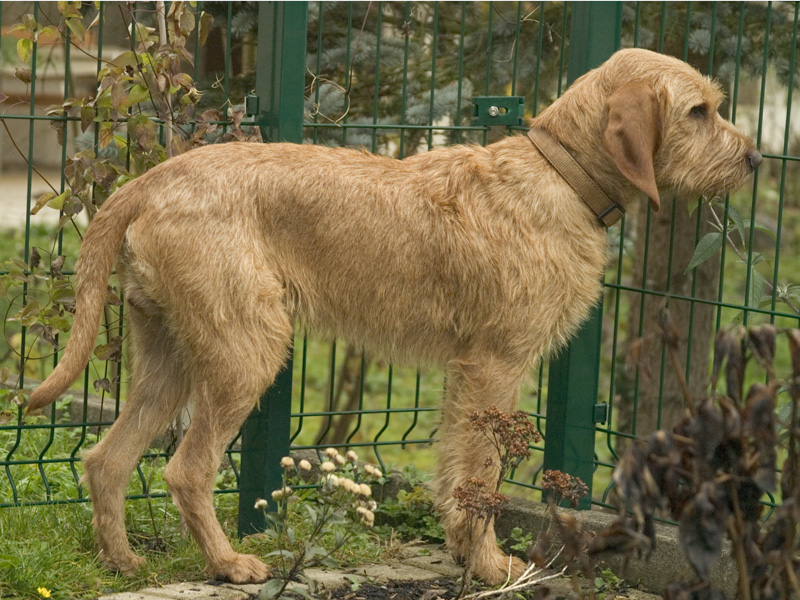
- Griffon Fauve de Bretagne No. 66
- Origin: France
Kennel club standards
- Société Centrale Canine: standard
- Fédération Cynologique Internationale: standard

The Griffon Fauve de Bretagne (English: Fawn Brittany Griffon) is a breed of dog of the scenthound type, originating in France in the region of Brittany.

== Appearance ==
The Griffon Fauve de Bretagne is a medium-sized dog, 48 to 56 cm (19-22 ins, same for males and females) at the withers, with a distinctive rough (shaggy) pale coat, long drop ears, and a long tail carried up and in a slight curve. The body is short backed. The breed should appear bony and muscular. Colour of the coat can be any shade of fawn from golden to red.

== History ==
Grand Fauve de Bretagnes were used in packs for hunting wolves and wild boar, and Francois I was known to keep a pack. With the elimination of wolves in the 19th century, they nearly became extinct and examples were crossed with Briquet Griffon Vendéens to create the smaller Griffon Fauve de Bretagne.

In 1949, Marcel Pambrun founded the Club de Fauve de Bretagne to save the remains of the breed that had been kept alive by a few farmers and hunters. Since the 1980s, the Griffon Fauve de Bretagne and the derived breed, the Basset Fauve de Bretagne, have been successfully restored in numbers and are popular hunting dogs.

The breed is a good hunting dog, still used in France to hunt boar, but is also a good family dog. Examples of the Griffon Fauve have been exported to other countries, where they are promoted as a rare breed for those seeking a unique pet.

== Health and temperament ==
No unusual health problems or claims of extraordinary health have been documented for this breed. The breed's ideal temperament is described in the breed standard as being wily and tenacious as a hunter on all terrains, but sociable and affectionate with people. Temperament of individual dogs may vary.

== See also ==
- List of dog breeds
- Dog terminology
- Griffon Bleu de Gascogne
- Basset Fauve de Bretagne
- Anglo French and French Hounds
