= Basset Fauve de Bretagne =

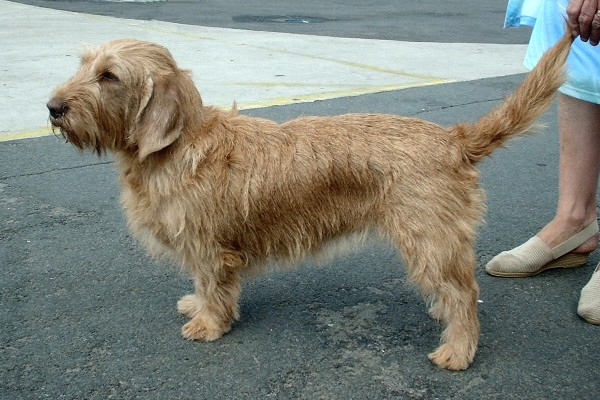
- Basset Fauve de Bretagne
- Other names: Fawn Brittany Basset
- Origin: France
Traits
- Height: 32–38 cm (13–15 in)
- Coat: very rough, fairly short
- Colour: fawn
Kennel club standards
- Société Centrale Canine: standard
- Fédération Cynologique Internationale: standard

The Basset Fauve de Bretagne is a short-legged hunting breed of dog of the scent hound type, originally from Brittany, a historical duchy of France.

== Description ==
=== Appearance ===
The Basset Fauve de Bretagne is a smallish hound, built along the same lines as the Basset Hound, but lighter all through and longer in the leg. Wire-coated, the coat is very harsh to the touch, dense, red-wheaten or fawn, sometimes with white markings on the chest. They measure 32 – 38 cm in height and weigh between 36 - 40 lbs but due to the historically controversial practice of registering mixed litters of Griffon and Basset Fauves, sometimes a litter of bassets will produce dogs with long legs. They have coarse, dense fur which may require stripping. Although their coat repels dirt and does not mat easily, they still require weekly combing and brushing. The hair on the ears is shorter, finer and darker than that on the coat. The ears just reach the end of the nose rather than trailing on the ground and should be pleated. They should have dark eyes and nose and ideally no crook on the front legs. The French standard says these are the shortest backed of all the basset breeds so they generally do not appear as exaggerated as the British Basset.

== Health ==
A 2006 study found a relatively low inbreeding coefficient, at 3.9%, the second-lowest of the nine French breeds in the study.

The Basset Fauve de Bretagne is one of the more commonly affected breeds for primary open angle glaucoma. An autosomal recessive mutation of the ADAMTS17 gene is responsible for the condition in the breed.

== History ==
The breed was developed in France as a hunting dog from the larger Grand Fauve de Bretagne, a breed that is now extinct. There was a rumour that the Basset Fauve de Bretagne was also close to extinction after the Second World War, and the breed was recreated using the remaining examples of the breed and crossing in standard wirehaired Dachshunds. However, the French club denies this, and says that Basset Fauve numbers were never so low. In 2002, there were 1060 new registrations of the Basset Fauve in France.

The breed in the UK is mainly seen as a show dog and family pet, finally coming off the Kennel Club's rare breed register in 2007. In the UK, under 140 dogs are registered a year. It can also be found in other parts of Europe where it is used to scent trail and also as a family pet.

In 2026, the American Kennel Club fully recognized the breed.

== See also ==
- List of dog breeds
- Basset Bleu de Gascogne
- Grand Basset Griffon Vendéen
- Petit Basset Griffon Vendéen
- Basset Artésien Normand
