= Serbian Hound =

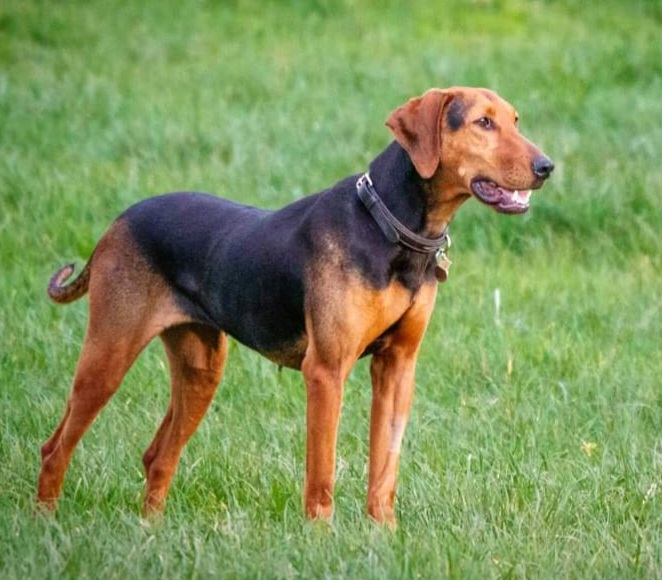
- Other names: Balkan Hound
- Origin: Serbia
Traits
| Height | Males | 46–56 cm (18–22 in) |
| | Females | 44–54 cm (17–21 in) |
- Weight: ≈ 20 kg (44 lb)
- Coat: Short
- Colour: Red (fox coloured), from yellow red to a rust, with black mantle or saddle
Kennel club standards
- Fédération Cynologique Internationale: standard

The Serbian Hound (Serbo-Croatian: srpski gonič / српски гонич), previously known as the Balkan Hound (Serbo-Croatian: balkanski gonič / балкански гонич), is a breed of scent hound from Serbia.

== Description ==
The Serbian Hound is a medium sized hound breed, the breed standard states dogs should stand between 46 and 56 centimetres (18 and 22 in) with bitches being slightly smaller, standing between 44 and 54 centimetres (17 and 21 in), and they typically weigh around 20 kilograms (44 lb). The breed has a short, dense coat that is a distinctive reddish tan in colour, sometimes described as "fox coloured", with a large black saddle and black markings above the eyes. They have a broad skull which narrows evenly to the nose and medium-length, hanging ears. The breed's body is slightly longer than they are tall, they have a broad, straight back and a straight or slightly curved tail.

The Serbian Hound is described as well-disciplined, energetic, tenacious and lively in nature, they both track game and capture it; when hunting they have a distinctive high-pitched voice. The breed is known for its great stamina and ability to hunt over difficult terrain.

== History ==
There is a long tradition of hunting in South East Europe and the Serbian Hound is one of several regional hound (and horse) breeds that were bred to suit the hunting requirements of the region. The Serbian Hound is a centuries old breed, it is believed to be a composite of hound breeds that were traded around the Mediterranean, with European and North African dogs contributing to its ancestry. The Serbian Hound is traditionally kept as a pack hound, with its usual quarry being wild boar, deer, fox and hare.

Previously known as the Balkan Hound, Balkanski Gonič (балкански гонич), in 1996 the Fédération Cynologique Internationale officially changed the breed's name to the Serbian Hound, Srpski Gonič (Српски гонич).

== See also ==
- List of dog breeds
