= Greek Harehound =

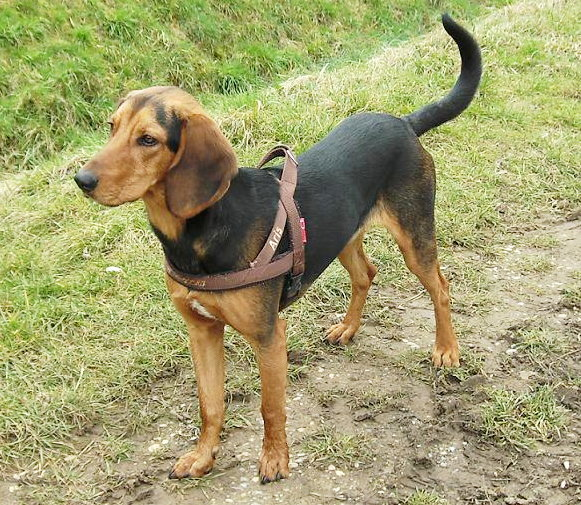
- A Greek Harehound
- Other names: Hellenikos Ichnilatis; Hellenic Hound; Greek Hound; Gkekas
- Origin: Greece
Kennel club standards
- Fédération Cynologique Internationale: standard

The Greek Harehound (Greek: Ελληνικός Ιχνηλάτης; FCI No. 214) is a rare breed of dog that only comes in a black and tan color, originally bred as a scenthound for tracking and chasing hare in Southern Greece.

== Description ==
The Greek Harehound is a medium-sized dog breed with short, black hair and tan markings. They stand from 18 to 22 inches (46 to 56 cm) and weigh from 38 to 44 pounds (17 to 20 kg). The breed is slightly longer than it is tall. The average lifespan for the Greek Harehound is about 13 years.

== History ==
The Greek Harehound is believed to be descended from the extinct Laconian breed, which originated in Ancient Greece. Its genetics have remained relatively unchanged for thousands of years due to isolation in the mountains of Greece. In 1996, the Greek Harehound was recognized by the Fédération Cynologique Internationale, and it remains the only Greek breed recognized by the FCI.
