= Transylvanian Hound =

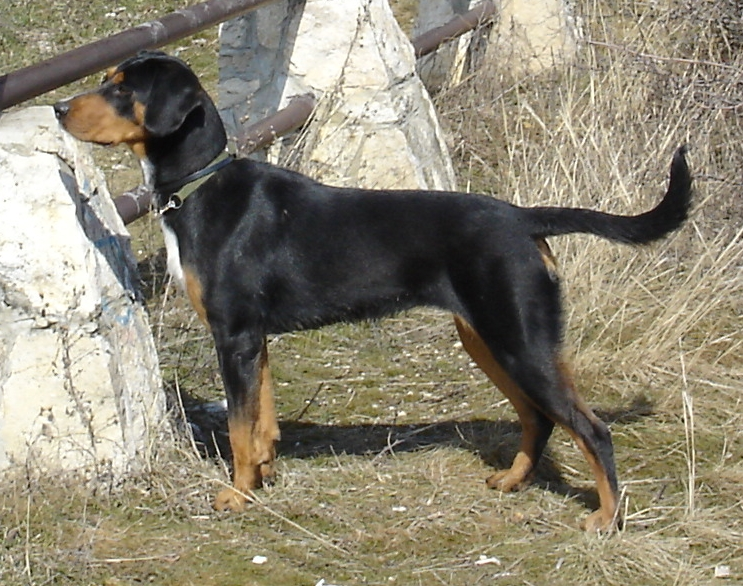
- Other names: Transylvanian Scent Hound; Hungarian Hound erdélyi kopó copoi ardelenesc
- Origin: Hungary
Traits
- Height: Short — 46–51 cm (18–20 in); Tall — 56–66 cm (22–26 in)
- Weight: Short — 22–25 kg (49–55 lb); Tall — 30–35 kg (66–77 lb)
- Coat: Short haired
- Colour: Short — Red & tan or tricolour Tall — Black & tan or tricolour
Kennel club standards
- Hungarian Kennel Club: standard
- Fédération Cynologique Internationale: standard

The Transylvanian Hound, (Note: Hungarian: erdélyi kopó [ˈɛrdeːji kopoː]; Romanian: copoi ardelenesc Romanian pronunciation: [ko'poj ardele'nesk];) also known as the Transylvanian Scent Hound or Hungarian Hound, is a Hungarian breed of scent hound used primarily for hunting. It originated in the former Kingdom of Hungary in the historical region of Transylvania, which is now part of Romania. It is strong and of medium size, characterized by a black body with tan and sometimes white markings on the muzzle, chest and extremities, and distinctive tan eyebrow spots. It has a high-pitched bark for a dog of its size. The breed was rescued from extinction by focused breeding efforts in the late twentieth century. There were formerly two varieties, the tall and the short, developed for different kinds of hunting in the Middle Ages. Only the tall variety survives today.

== History ==
It is claimed the Transylvanian Hound descends from hounds brought by the Magyars when they crossed the Carpathian Mountains in the ninth century and bred with those already found in the area, with the resultant progeny becoming the foundation stock for the breed. In the Middle Ages the dog was the favourite of the Hungarian aristocracy for hunting various game animals. Two height varieties developed to hunt different game in different types of terrain, and both varieties were kept together.

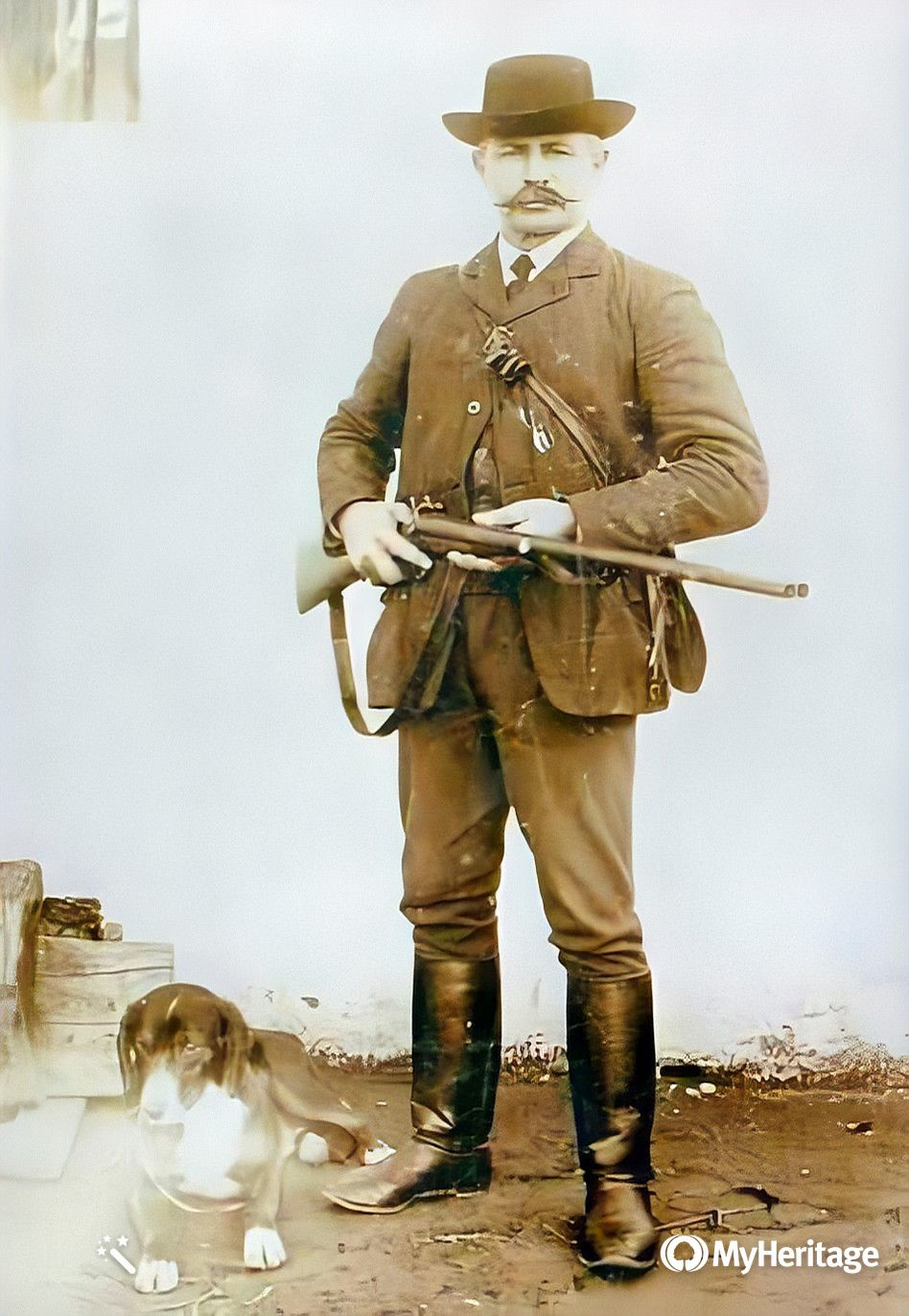
Hungarian Hound – Transylvanian Scenthound. Farkas Gábor (1852-1917), Hajdúhadház

The tall variety was used for hunting woodland and grassland big game, such as European bison, Eurasian brown bear, boar, and lynx. The short variety was used for hunting fox, hare, and chamois in overgrown or rocky terrain. The breed declined and was marginalised to the Carpathian woodlands, shrinking with the growth of agriculture and forestry, and by the beginning of the twentieth century it was nearly extinct. It was almost wiped out during the Second World War and in 1947, after Transylvania again became fully part of Romania. The Romanian government exterminated those that had survived in order to remove the reminder of Transylvania being formerly Hungarian. Some survived in Hungary and Slovakia, where breeders are working to revive the breed.

In 1886 the first official registration of the breed began with the "Hungarian Hunting Dog Pedigree" (Magyar Vadászeb Törzskönyv). In 1941 the breed was registered as a Hungarian Hound by the Hungarian National Vizsla Club/Hound Division (Magyar Országos Vizsla Klub/Kopó szakosztály) and recovery of the breed started with 27 individuals; the Second World War put an end to this. A further recovery operation began in the 1960s.

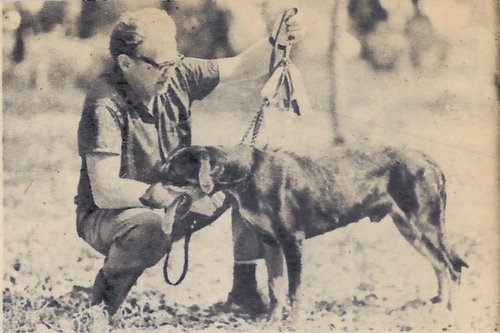
Állatkerti Dákó 1970

The breed was recognised and standardised by the Fédération Cynologique Internationale in 1963, with definitive acceptance on 30 March in that year. In 1968 further efforts began to recover it. In the twenty-first century, substantial numbers of the tall variety of the dogs may be found in both Hungary and Romania.

The Transylvanian Hound is, naturally, recognised by the national dog breeding and fancier group, the Hungarian Kennel Club (using the FCI breed standard).

== Description ==
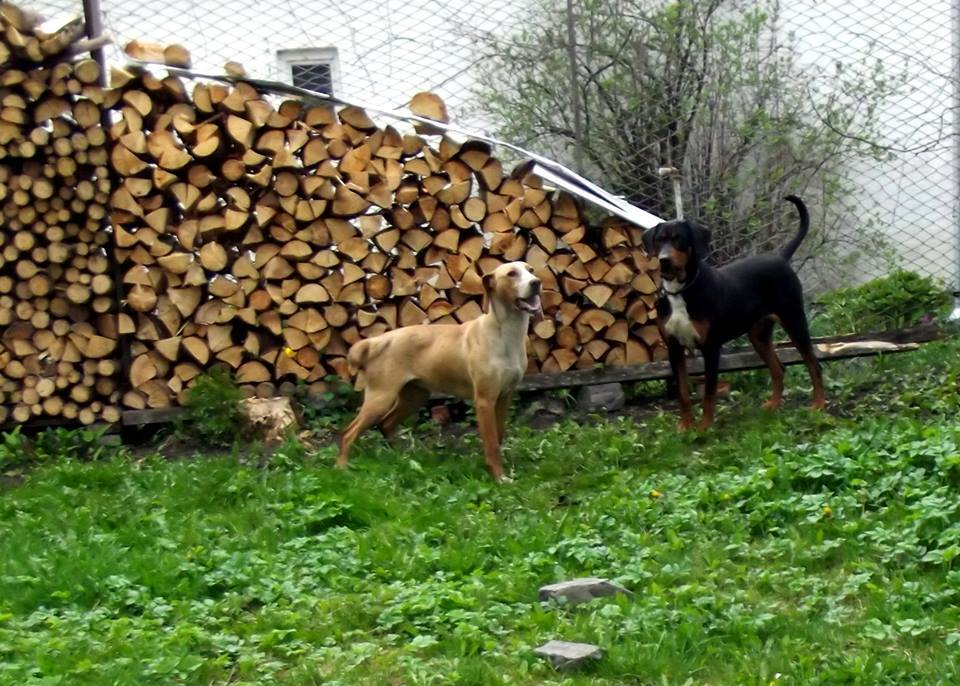
Short-legged and long-legged Transylvanian Hounds

There are two size variants of the Transylvanian Hound, although the FCI breed standard only describes the long-legged variety. The short-legged variety typically stands between 46 and 51 cm (18 and 20 in) and the long-legged variety between 56 and 66 cm (22 and 26 in). The short-legged variety typically weighs between 22 and 25 kg (49 and 55 lb), the long-legged variety some 30–35 kg (66–77 lb). It has a typical scent hound head, long but not pointed and free from wrinkles; the ears are medium-sized and pendent, wide in the middle and tapering to a rounded tip. The body is relatively long but square, the chest broad and long but not overly deep; the low-set tail is kept undocked, and when hunting is typically carried curled at the level of the back. The coat is short, straight and close fitting, slightly longer in the long-legged variety than in the short. The short-legged variety is usually dark red and tan or dark red and tan tricolour (dark red, tan and white) in colour, while the long-legged variety is usually black and tan or black and tan tricolour (black, tan and white).

The continental climate of its native land, with its hot summers and cold winters with heavy snow falls, has resulted in a breed with great stamina as well as a very keen and reliable scenting ability.

The Transylvanian Hound is usually obedient, good natured, tolerant of children and easy to train; as a pack hound it is very friendly with other dogs. It is described as being reserved, slightly suspicious and introspective in character; when hunting it shows courage and a good sense of orientation.

The Transylvanian Hound is a healthy breed with a longer-than-average lifespan (12–14 years) and without any known, special hereditary disease.
