= Grand Basset Griffon Vendéen =

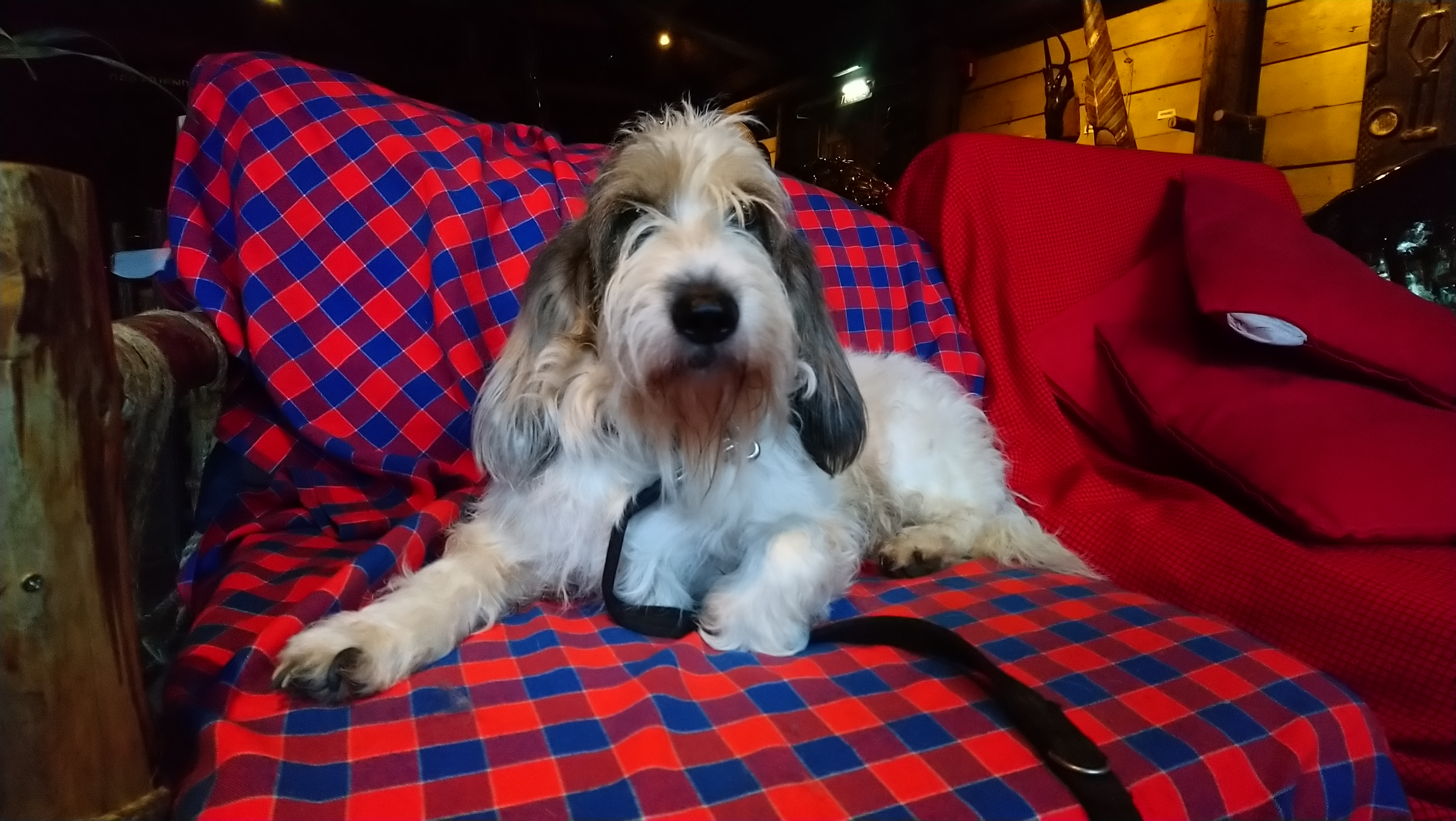
- Grand Basset Griffon Vendéen
- Other names: Basset Griffon Vendéen (Grand), GBGV
- Common nicknames: GBGV
- Origin: France
Traits
Height	Males	40–44 cm (16–17 in)
	Females	39–43 cm (15–17 in)
- Coat: Hard, not too long and flat, never silky or woolly.
- Colour: White, with any combination of lemon, orange, sable, grizzle or black markings. Tricolour. Black and tan.
- Litter size: 7–12 average
Kennel club standards
- Société Centrale Canine: standard
- Fédération Cynologique Internationale: standard

The Grand Basset Griffon Vendéen or GBGV is a dog breed from France.

== History ==
The Grand Basset Griffon Vendéen is derived from the Grand Griffon. The first selections were made at the end of the 19th century by the Comte d'Elva who was looking for subjects with "straight legs". But it was Paul Dézamy who was especially responsible for fixing the type. He had understood that in order to catch a hare, dogs of a certain size were needed. He fixed the size at about 43 cm. Today used primarily when hunting with a gun, it is capable of hunting all mammalian game, from the rabbit to the wild boar. A team of Grand Bassets won the fifth edition of the European Cup for hare. The GBGV is one of six types of "basset"-type breeds recognised by the Fédération Cynologique Internationale (FCI).

== Description ==
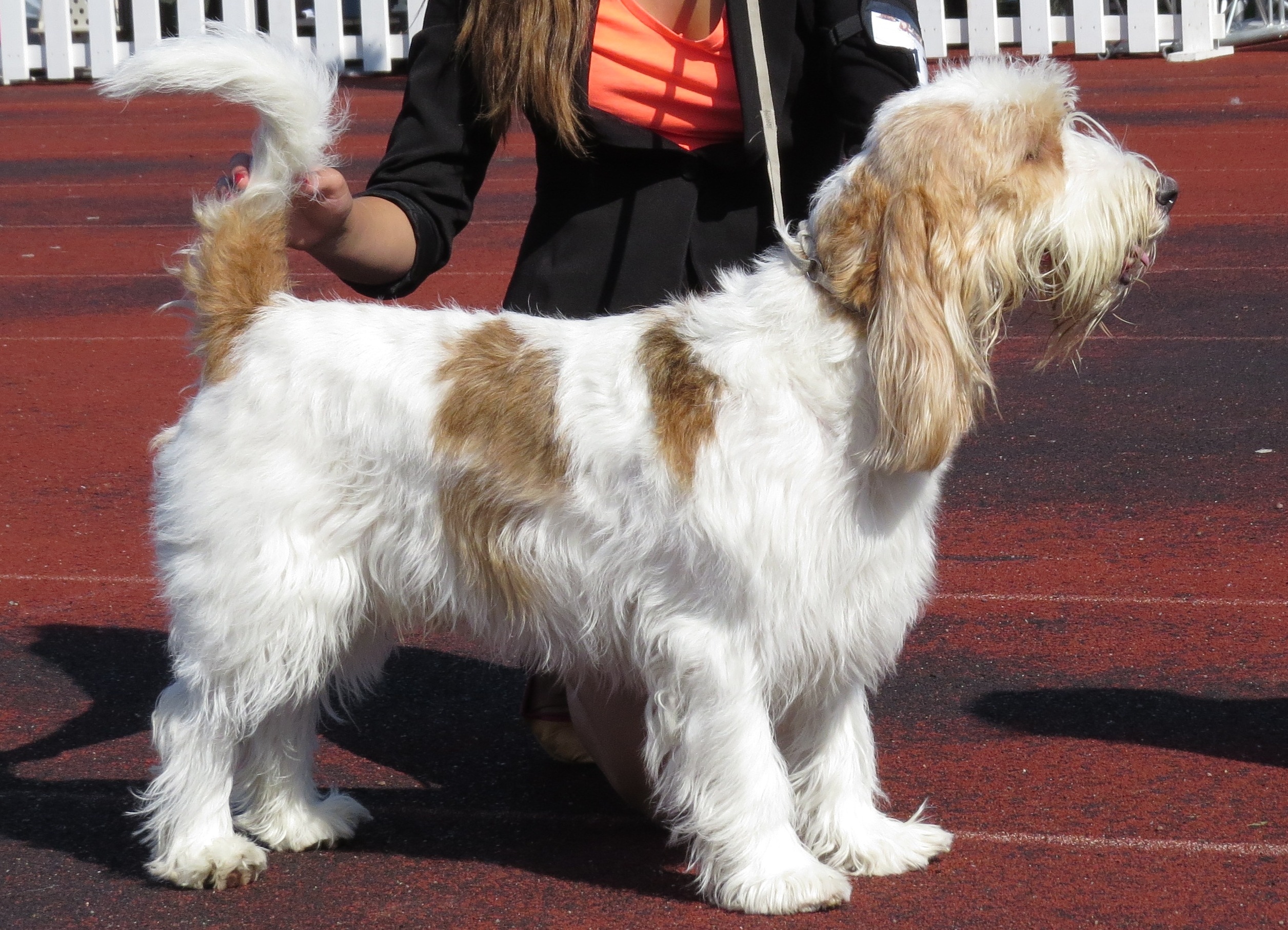
Grand Basset Griffon Vendéen

=== Appearance ===
The Grand Basset Griffon Vendéen is a long-backed, short-legged hunting breed of the hound type, originating in the Vendée region of France. They are still used today to hunt boar, deer, and to track rabbit and hare, but are more commonly kept as a domestic pet.

=== Temperament ===
Grand Basset Griffon Vendéens tend to be amiable and outgoing, and generally get along well with other dogs because of their pack hunting background. They have a high prey drive and like to follow their nose, and are known to be fairly vocal. However, due to their high prey drive, some owners have reported resource guarding and food-aggression, especially when young.

== Health ==
=== Longevity ===
Average longevity of 76 deceased Basset Griffon Vendéens (varieties combined) in the 2004 UK Kennel Club survey was 12.1 years (maximum 17.3 years). Leading causes of death were cancer (33%), old age (24%), and cardiac (7%).

Compared to surveyed longevities of other breeds of similar size, Basset Griffon Vendéens have a typical or somewhat higher than average life expectancy.

Among 289 live Basset Griffon Vendéens (varieties combined) in the 2004 UKC survey, the most common health issues noted by owners were reproductive, dermatologic (dermatitis and mites), and aural (otitis externa, excessive ear wax, and ear mites).

== See also ==
- List of dog breeds
- Basset Hound
- Basset Bleu de Gascogne
- Basset Fauve de Bretagne
- Basset Artésien Normand
- Petit Basset Griffon Vendéen
