= ADAMTS17 =

Protein-coding gene in humans

Identifiers
- Aliases: ADAMTS17, ADAM metallopeptidase with thrombospondin type 1 motif 17, WMS4
- External IDs: OMIM: 607511; MGI: 3588195; GeneCards: ADAMTS17

Gene location (Mouse)
Chr.	Chromosome 7 (mouse)
Band	7|7 C	Start	66,489,483 bp
Band	7|7 C	End	66,802,919 bp
RNA expression pattern
Bgee	Human / Mouse (ortholog); Top expressed in: thymus; right lobe of liver; tibia; gastrocnemius muscle; body of pancreas; amniotic fluid; minor salivary glands; germinal epithelium; skin of abdomen; gastric mucosa / Top expressed in: upper arm; mesenchyme; trigeminal ganglion; spinal ganglia; genital tubercle; tail of embryo; secondary oocyte; peripheral nervous system; superior cervical ganglion; primary oocyte; More reference expression data
BioGPS	n/a
Gene ontology
Molecular function	peptidase activity; metalloendopeptidase activity; hydrolase activity; metallopeptidase activity; metal ion binding; nucleic acid binding
Cellular component	extracellular region
Biological process	proteolysis
Sources:Amigo / QuickGO
Orthologs
Databases	NCBI: entry
Species	Human	Mouse
Entrez	170691	233332
Ensembl	n/a	ENSMUSG00000058145
UniProt	Q8TE56	n/a
RefSeq (mRNA)	NM_139057	NM_001033877
RefSeq (protein)	NP_620688	n/a
Location (UCSC)	n/a	Chr 7: 66.49 – 66.8 Mb
PubMed search
- Wikidata
View/Edit Human	View/Edit Mouse

ADAM metallopeptidase with thrombospondin type 1 motif, 17 is a protein that in humans is encoded by the ADAMTS17 gene.

== Function ==
This gene encodes a member of the ADAMTS (a disintegrin and metalloproteinase with thrombospondin motifs) protein family. ADAMTS family members share several distinct protein modules, including a propeptide region, a metalloproteinase domain, a disintegrin-like domain, and a thrombospondin type 1 (TS) motif. Individual members of this family differ in the number of C-terminal TS motifs, and some have unique C-terminal domains. The protein encoded by this gene has a high sequence similarity to the protein encoded by ADAMTS19, another family member. The function of this protein has not been determined. [provided by RefSeq, Jul 2008].

== Clinical significance ==
Mutations in ADAMTS17 are associated with Weill–Marchesani syndrome.
