= Petit Basset Griffon Vendéen =

French breed of dog

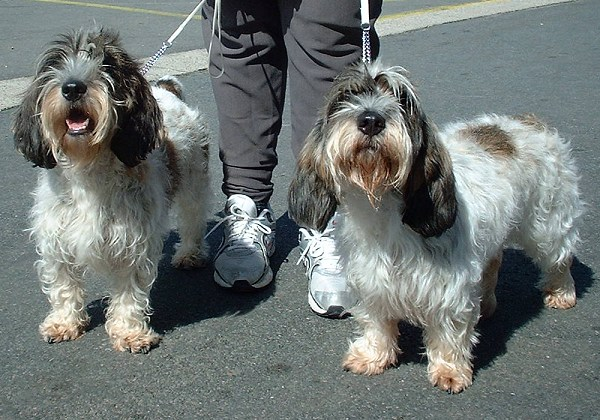
- Origin: France
Traits
- Height: 34–38 cm (13–15 in)
- Coat: rough, medium length
- Colour: white with any combination of lemon, orange, black, tri-colour or grizzle markings
Kennel club standards
- Société Centrale Canine: standard
- Fédération Cynologique Internationale: standard

The Petit Basset Griffon Vendéen (Note: /pɛˌtiː bæˌseɪ ɡrɪˌfɒn vɑːndeɪˈɑːn/) is a French breed of small dog of scent hound type, bred to trail hares in bramble-filled terrain of the Vendée district of France. It is one of four Griffon Vendéen breeds, together with the Grand Griffon Vendéen, the Briquet Griffon Vendéen and the Grand Basset Griffon Vendéen, and one of six breeds of basset type recognised by the Fédération Cynologique Internationale.

== Health ==
A 2024 UK study found a life expectancy of 13.7 years for the breed compared to an average of 12.7 for purebreeds and 12 for crossbreeds.

=== Morbidity ===
In the PBGV Club of America 2000 survey, the most common diseases reported by owners of 640 dogs were persistent pupillary membranes, recurrent ear infections, hypothyroidism, neck pain, and epilepsy, treated with daily medication, principally phenobarbitol. In later years they can develop an eye condition known to mainly effect German Shepherds, called Panis. This is kept at bay using steroidal eye drops.

Among 289 live Basset Griffon Vendéens (both varieties) in the 2004 UKC survey, the most common health issues noted by owners were reproductive, dermatologic (dermatitis and mites), and aural (otitis externa, excessive ear wax, and ear mites). They are also prone to dislocation of their hips due to their long bodies, short legs, and the fact they carry a robust amount of weight for their size. On average around 15 kg.

The Basset Petit Griffon Vendéen is one of the more commonly affected breeds for primary open angle glaucoma. An autosomal recessive mutation of the ADAMTS17 gene is responsible for the condition in the breed.
