= Hunting and shooting in the United Kingdom =

In the United Kingdom, the term hunting generally refers to hunting with hounds, e.g. normally fox hunting, stag (deer) hunting, beagling, or minkhunting, whereas shooting is the shooting of game birds. What is called deer hunting elsewhere is deer stalking. According to the British Association for Shooting and Conservation (BASC) over a million people a year participate in shooting, including stalking, shooting, hunting, clay shooting and target shooting. Firearm ownership is regulated by licensing.

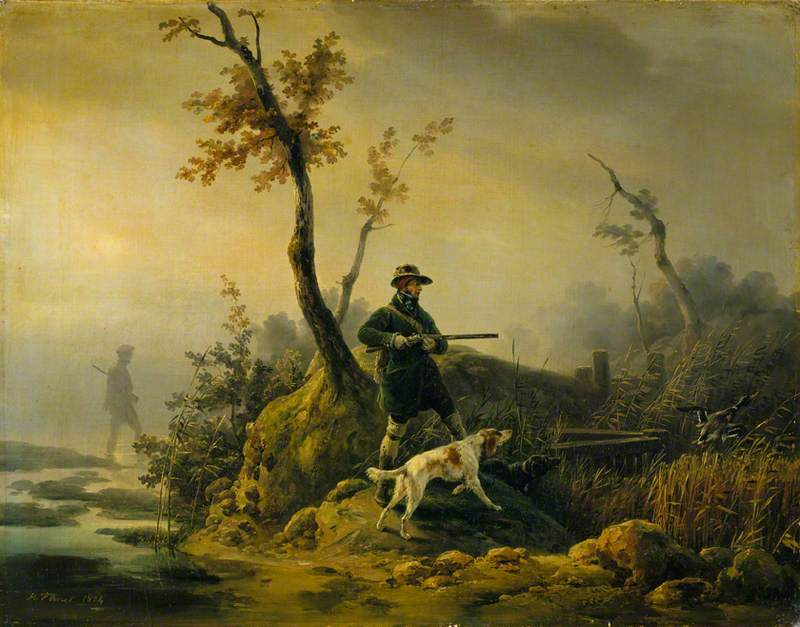
Duck Shooting, Horace Vernet, 1824

== History ==
Hunting has been practised by humans in Britain since prehistoric times; it was a crucial activity of hunter-gatherer societies before the domestication of animals and the dawn of agriculture. During the last ice age, humans and Neanderthals hunted mammoths and woolly rhinoceroses by driving them over cliffs; evidence has been found at La Cotte de St Brelade on the island of Jersey. In Britain, hunting with hounds was popular in Celtic Britain before the Romans arrived, using the Agassaei breed. The Romans brought their Castorian and Fulpine hound breeds to England, along with importing the brown hare (the mountain hare is native) and fallow deer as quarry. Wild boar was also hunted.

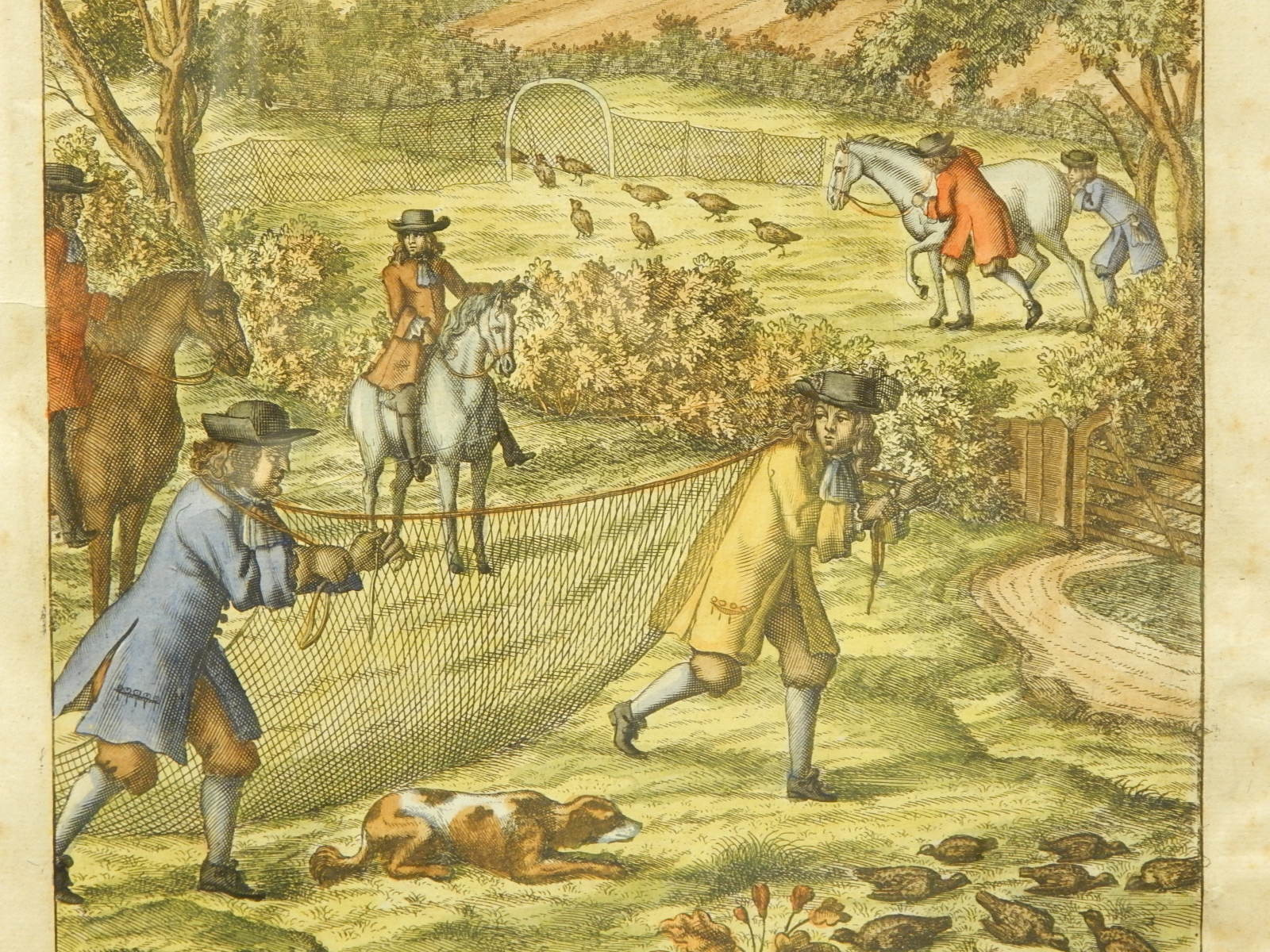
The Gentlemans Recreation by Richard Blome, 1686

Blunderbuss firearms were improved during the 18th and 19th centuries and percussion cap shotguns became more popular. To protect the pheasants for the shooters, gamekeepers culled competitive species such as foxes, magpies and birds of prey almost to extirpation in popular areas, and landowners improved their coverts and other habitats for game. Game Laws were relaxed by Parliament in 1831, which meant anyone could obtain a permit to shoot rabbits, hares, and gamebirds, although shooting and taking away any birds or animals on someone else's land without their permission continued to count as the crime of poaching, and continues to do so today.

Hunting was formerly a royal sport, and to an extent shooting still is, with many kings and queens being involved in hunting and shooting, including King Edward VII, King George V (who could shoot over a thousand pheasants on a single day), King George VI and Prince Philip, although Queen Elizabeth II did not shoot. Shooting on the large estates of Scotland has always been a fashionable country sport. This trend is generally attributed to the Victorians, who were inspired by the romantic nature of the Scottish Highlands.

== Shooting ==
The shooting of game birds, in particular pheasant, is often on land managed by a gamekeeper using British country clothing. When hunting with shotguns, there is a risk of accidentally injuring birds that survive. The bird struck by the central cluster of the shot typically dies and falls to the ground. However, animals on the periphery of the shot may still be hit by some pellets, which they survive but result in lifelong suffering. Shooting from too far away also increases the risk of causing harm to animals due to the increased spread of shot pellets.

Game birds are shot in different ways. In driven game shooting, where beaters are employed to walk through woods and over moors or fields, dependent on the quarry and time of year and drive game towards a line of 8–10 standing guns standing about 50 or 60 metres apart. Large numbers of pheasants, partridge and duck, but not grouse, are reared and released to provide sufficient numbers of game. Grouse cannot be reared intensively but the heather moorland where they live is intensively managed to maximise numbers.

Rough shooting, where several guns walk through a woodland, moor or field and shoot the birds their dogs put up, is increasingly popular. It is less formal and may be funded by several people grouping together to form a syndicate, paying a certain amount each year towards pheasants and habitat maintenance.

Rook shooting was once popular in rural Britain for both pest control and gaining food, wherein juvenile rooks living in rookeries, known as "branchers", were shot before they were able to fly. These events were both very social and a source of food (the rook becomes inedible once mature) as the rook and rabbit pie was considered a great delicacy.

== Game animals ==
In the UK "game" is defined in law by the Game Act 1831. Other (non-game) birds that are hunted for food in the UK are specified under the Wildlife and Countryside Act 1981. UK law defines game as including:

Game seasons
Species	England, Scotland and Wales	Northern Ireland
Pheasant	1 October – 1 February	1 October – 31 January
Partridge, grey and red-legged	1 September – 1 February	1 September – 31 January
Black grouse	20 August – 10 December	N/A
Red grouse	12 August – 10 December	12 August – 30 November
Ptarmigan	12 August – 10 December	N/A
Brown hare	No closed season (England and Wales) 1 October – 31 January (Scotland)	12 August – 31 January

Bolt action rifles are used for deer stalking. This may be carried out on moors, or in woodland. Deer hunted in the UK are red deer, roe deer, fallow deer, sika deer, muntjac, water deer, and hybrids of these deer.

Only certain 'quarry' species of wildfowl may legally be shot in the UK, and are protected under the Wildlife and Countryside Act 1981. These are mallard, Eurasian wigeon, teal, pochard, shoveler, pintail, gadwall, goldeneye, tufted duck, Canada goose, greylag goose and pink-footed goose. Other common quarry targets for the wildfowler include the common snipe. Eurasian coot and moorhen are also shot, but not as much as in the past; they have a closed season that follows the wildfowl season and are classed as game.

Although there is no close season for brown hare in England and Wales, the Hares Preservation Act 1892 (55 & 56 Vict. c. 8) makes it illegal to sell, or offer to sell, hare between 1 March and 31 July. A close season for brown hare was introduced in Scotland in 2012.

The aforementioned species are those primarily pursued for game shooting. To this list can be added birds as the feral pigeon, jay, magpie, carrion crow, jackdaw and rook, wood pigeon, woodcock, snipe, and the Golden plover. Mammals as the European rabbit are also hunted.

Black grouse are no longer shot regularly, due to a continuing decline in numbers and those that are shot are most likely to be females mistaken for red grouse. Capercaillie are also no longer shot in the UK, as they are now protected due to a long-term decline in population.

== Wildfowling ==
Waterfowl hunting is typically in the form of a single gun sitting in pursuit of ducks by a body of water, or on the coastal foreshore, often at dawn or dusk, and waits for birds to flight. This is sometimes undertaken in total darkness. Due to the ban on the use of lead shot for hunting waterfowl or over wetlands, many wildfowlers are switching to modern guns with stronger engineering to allow the use of non-toxic ammunition such as steel or tungsten based cartridges.

In the UK wildfowling is largely self-regulated. Their representative body, WAGBI (Wildfowlers Association of Great Britain and Ireland), was founded in 1908 by Stanley Duncan in Hull. This Association changed its name in 1981 to become the British Association for Shooting and Conservation (BASC) and now represents all forms of live quarry shooting at European, national and local levels. There are also many wildfowling clubs around the coast of Great Britain, often covering certain estuary areas where wildfowl are found in large numbers.

== Unlawful hunting ==
As of 2025 game shooting and deer stalking are carried on as field sports in Great Britain and Northern Ireland. Hunting with hounds in the traditional manner became unlawful in Scotland in 2002 and in England and Wales in 2005, but continues in certain accepted forms. Traditional foxhunting continues in Northern Ireland. Following a trail (similar to drag hunting) rather than a live quarry has subsequently grown in importance in Great Britain, as has hunting foxes with a bird of prey. In 2005 it became unlawful in England and Wales to shoot game birds while they are not in flight, an action which has long been considered unsporting. Bowhunting is illegal in the United Kingdom for all animals. Hunting illegally or causing suffering to an animal can lead to fines and prison sentences.

== See also ==
- Jagdschloss
- Pavillon de chasse
