= Glorious Twelfth =

12 August; start of grouse shooting season

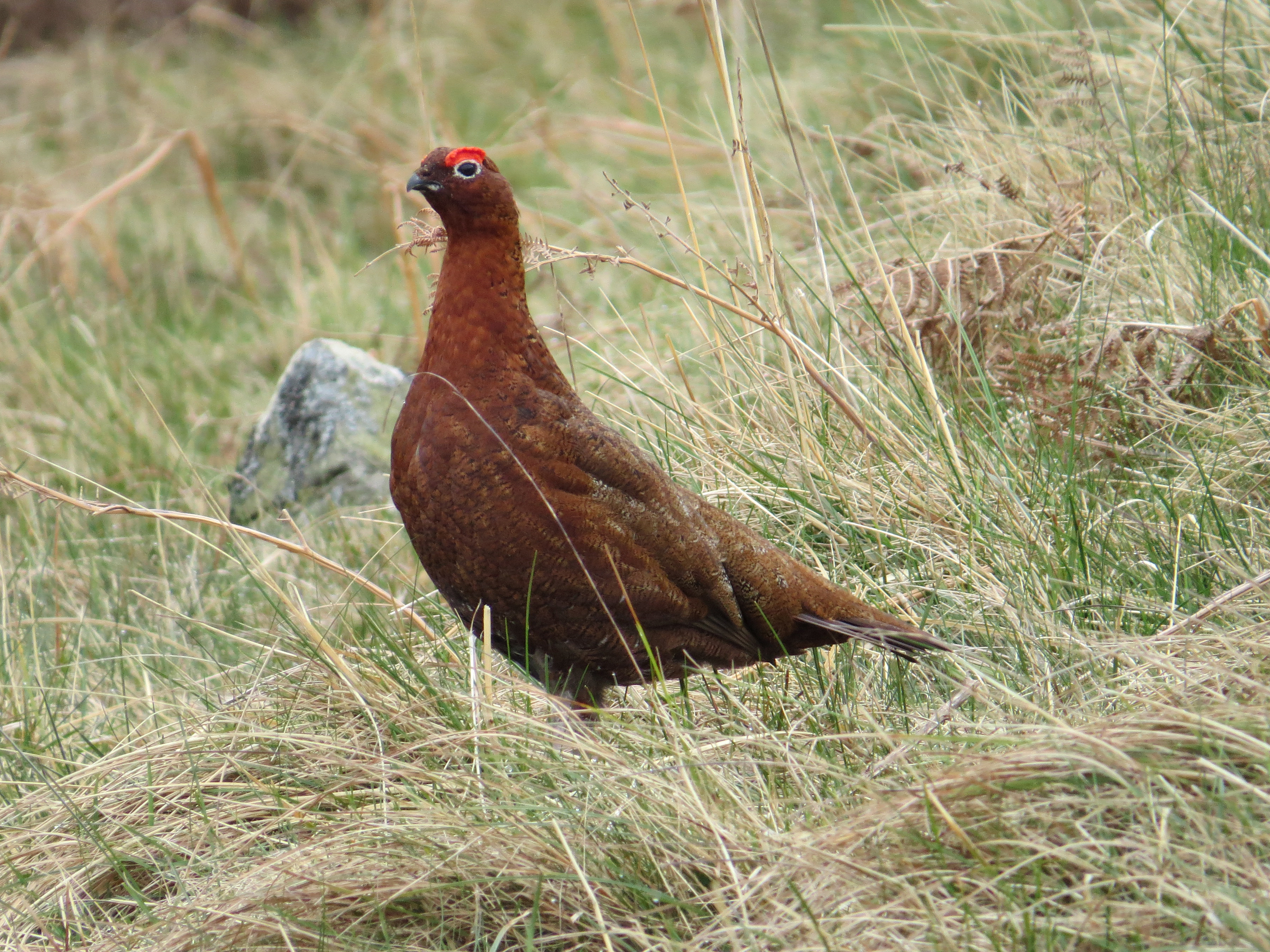
Red grouse

The Glorious Twelfth is the twelfth day of August, signifying the start of the shooting season for red grouse (Lagopus scotica) in Great Britain and Northern Ireland, with the ptarmigan (Lagopus muta) also being hunted to a lesser extent during this period. Not all game (as defined by the 1831 act) have the same start to their open seasons – most begin on 1 September, with 1 October for woodcock and pheasant. Since English law prohibits game bird shooting on a Sunday, the start date is postponed to 13 August on years when the 12th falls on a Sunday.

The date itself is of traditional significance; the current legislation enshrining it in England and Wales is the Game Act 1831 (and in Northern Ireland, the Wildlife (Northern Ireland) Order 1985). Prior to the Game Act of 1831, the Game Act of 1773 stipulated that red grouse, or "red-game," could not be sold before August 12, effectively starting the shooting season on this day.

Because heather moorland is managed for shooting, the population density of red grouse is unnaturally high. However, supporters argue that moorland managed for grouse shooting typically contains high levels of biodiversity, including ground-nesting birds (such as lapwing, curlew, meadow pipit, golden plover, redshank and woodcock, in addition to red grouse) and raptor species. Diseases such as the sheep tick, heather beetle (which attacks the heather that several of these species eat) and the intestinal parasite Trichostrongylus tenuis can impact population sizes.

In recent years, the Glorious Twelfth has also been affected by hunt saboteurs, the 2001 foot and mouth crisis (which further postponed the date in affected areas) and severe flooding and bad weather. In some seasons, when certain moors are affected by low grouse numbers, shooting may not take place at all, or may be over by September.

Some restaurants in London have for years prided themselves on being able to serve grouse on the Glorious Twelfth, with the birds being shot that morning and immediately transported to London via rail. This tradition persisted. On 12 August 2024, Harry Cole noted that no restaurants in London were offering this service, reported the next day by The Telegraph to be caused by an "unusually cold" breeding season and unrealistically high prices. Wildlife advocacy groups sometimes refer to the day as the "inglorious 12th."

== See also ==
- Hunting and shooting in the United Kingdom
