= Driven grouse shooting =

Hunting of the red grouse

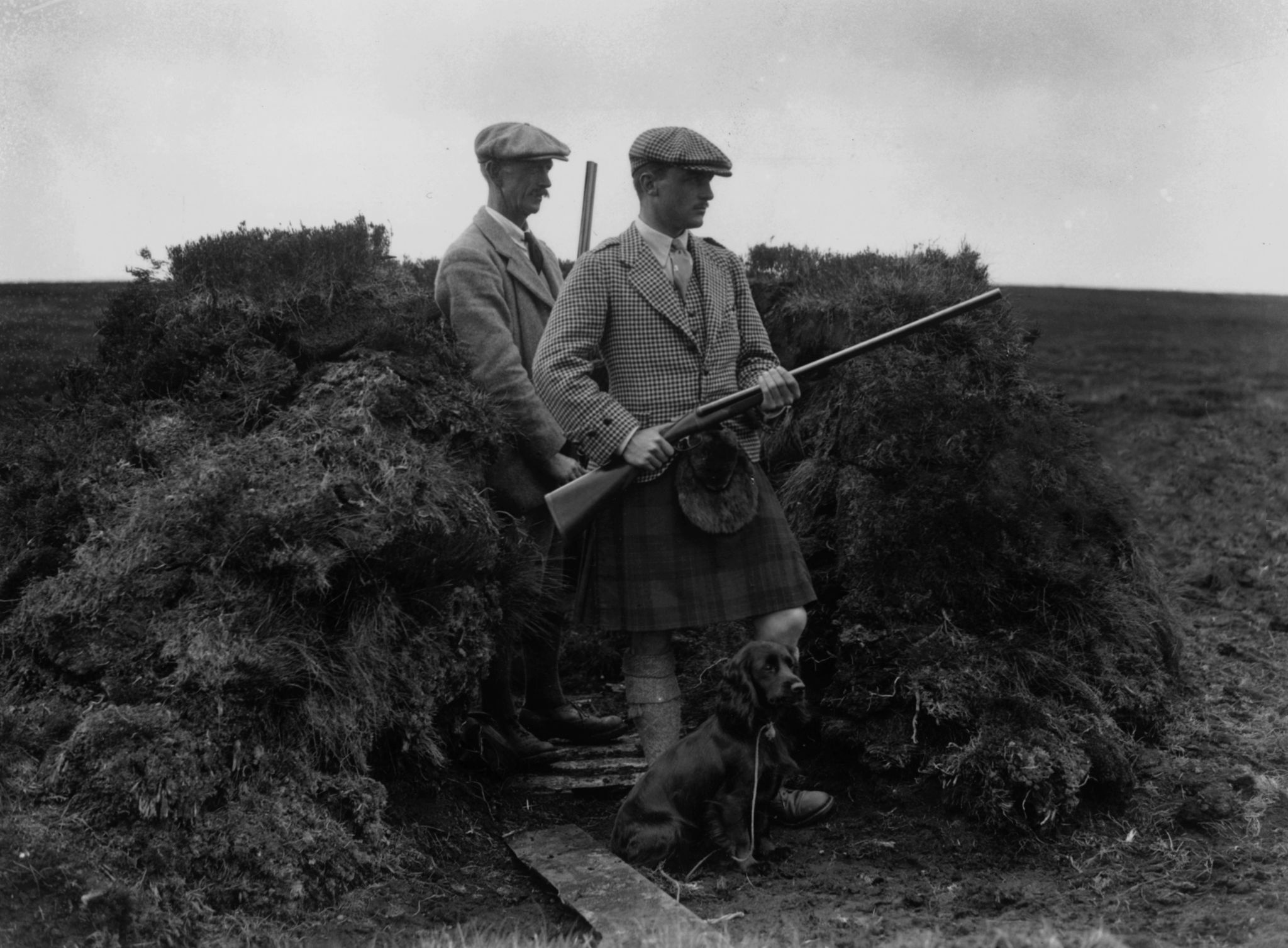
Gamekeeper (left) with a shooter on a driven grouse shoot in the Scottish Highlands (1922)

Driven grouse shooting is a field sport in the United Kingdom that involves the shooting of red grouse. It is one of two forms of the sport; the other is walked-up shooting. Driven grouse shooting involves grouse being driven (i.e. encouraged and corralled by beaters) to fly over people with shotguns in fixed positions. In contrast, walked-up shooting involves participants advancing in a line and flushing the birds as they move forward. Walked-up shooting is more physically demanding than driven shooting, often resulting in a lower number of birds being shot.

The grouse shooting season begins on 12 August, except in the Isle of Man, where it would start on 25 August were it not for a voluntary ban now in place. It ends on 10 December, except in Northern Ireland (30 November) and the Isle of Man (31 October). 12 August is sometimes referred to as the "Glorious Twelfth" by enthusiasts of the sport.

The sport first appeared around 1850 and gained popularity among the wealthy in the late Victorian era. The expanding railway network provided relatively easy access to the remote upland areas of Britain for the first time and in parallel with this, driven grouse shooting became possible in a convenient and reliable form. In driven grouse shooting, large numbers of birds are driven over a fixed position, providing a regular supply of fast-moving targets without the need to seek out the birds. The advent of the breech-loading shotgun was also an essential part of the development of the practice, as it allowed for more rapid reloading in the field, matching the availability of target birds.

Shooting takes place on grouse moors: areas of moorland in Scotland, northern England, and Wales. These areas, covering some 16,763 square kilometres (6,472 sq mi) in extent, about 8% of the combined area of England and Scotland, are managed to provide a favourable habitat for red grouse. Between 1870 and 1965 the sheep population in Scotland fell by about 500,000 animals because of commercial competition from Australia and New Zealand. As a result, areas of former pasture were converted to deer forests or grouse moors.

Management techniques used on grouse moors include heather burning, also known as "muirburn" in Scotland, to ensure a sustainable supply of both young and old-growth heather, and predator control – mainly foxes and predatory birds such as corvids (including crows and magpies). Some people oppose these practices because some species are killed for the benefit of others, although proponents of managed moorland argue that the species targeted are abundant, while those benefited are of greater conservation importance. These include ground-nesting birds such as the lapwing, curlew, meadow pipit, golden plover, redshank and woodcock.

There has been controversy over the alleged persecution of raptors on grouse moors. Raptors are legally protected species in the United Kingdom. Opponents of grouse moor management also argue that such practices prevent the development of natural landscapes, forest and bog regeneration, and ecotourism.

== Description ==
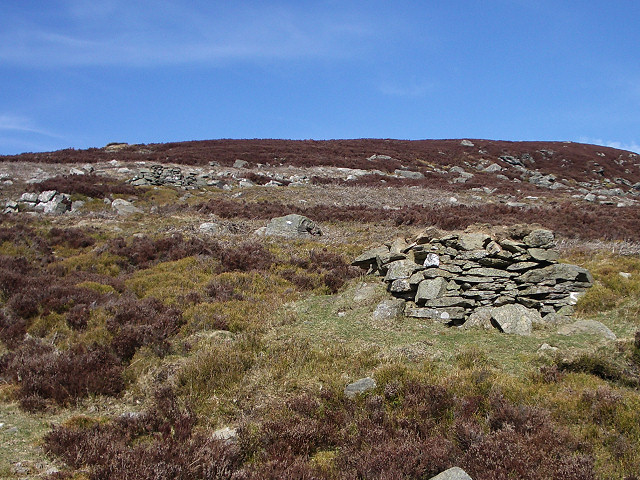
Shooting butts on Scottish grouse moor

The red grouse is a medium-sized bird of the grouse family or subfamily. It is found in heather moorland in Great Britain and Ireland. It is usually classified as a subspecies of the willow grouse, but is sometimes considered to be a separate species Lagopus scoticus, found only in the British Isles. It is also known as the moorfowl or moorbird. Grouse can fly at speeds of up to 130 km/h (81 mph), making them difficult targets. The name "driven grouse shooting" refers to the way in which the grouse are driven by clubs towards the shooters (otherwise known as 'guns'). A shooting party usually consists of 8–10 guns standing in a line in the butts—hides for shooting spaced some 20–30 m (66–98 ft) apart, screened by a turf or stone wall and usually sunk into the ground to minimise their profile—to shoot the grouse in flight. A code of conduct governs behaviour on the grouse moor both for safety and etiquette.

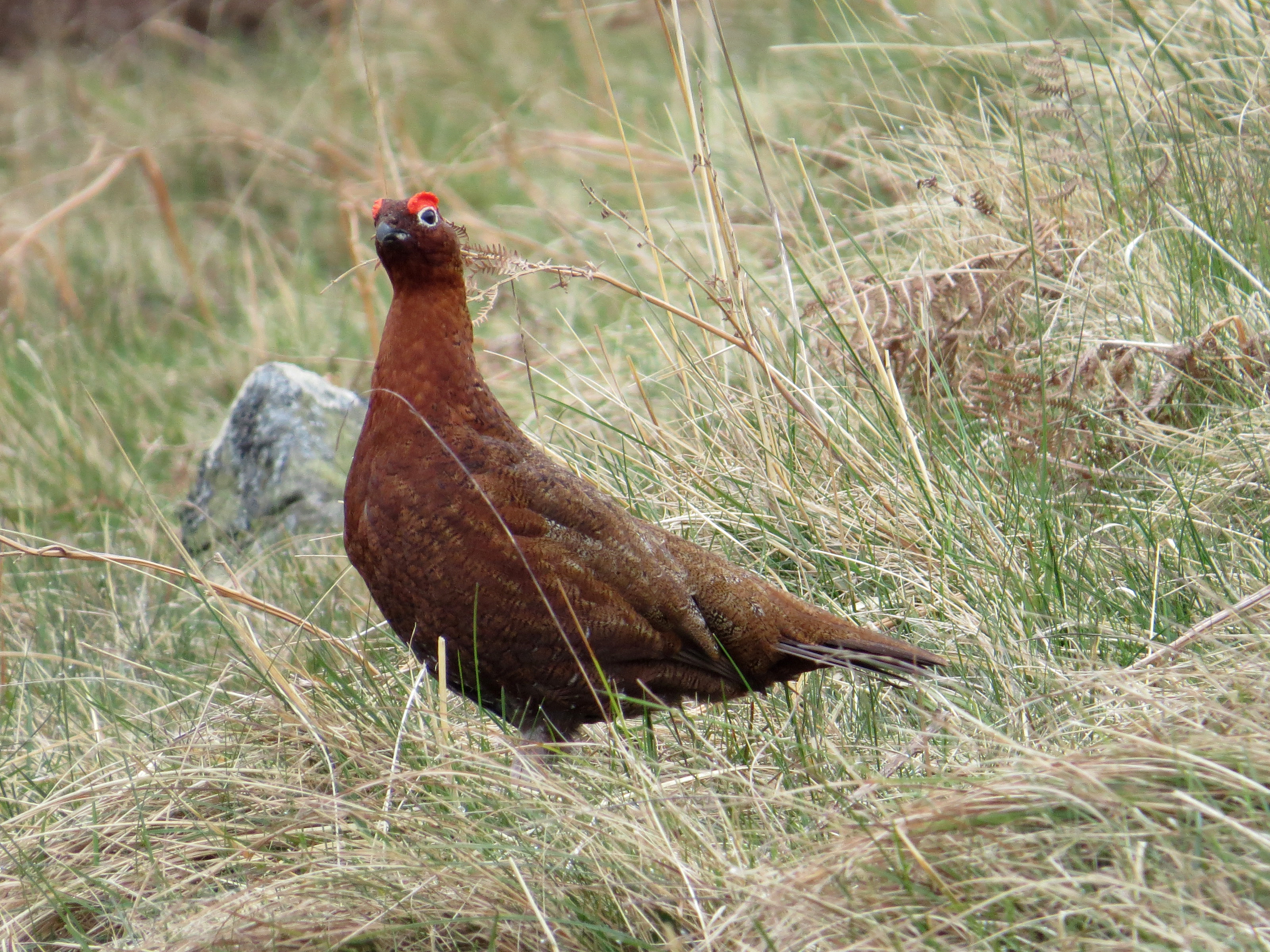
Red grouse

Grouse moors have been described as "the ultimate trophy asset... one of the ultimate playthings, for which people will pay far more than the asset value."

Grouse shooting can also be undertaken by 'walking up' grouse over pointers, or by flushing the birds with other dogs.

In southern Sweden, this form of hunting is referred to as fjälljakt, a term which originates from the Swedish term for the mountain biome itself. This biome is not managed through burning, but rather consists of a wooded mosaic, comprising heather, trees, lakes and bogland. Its management by, in particular, large wild herbivores such as moose maintains this mosaic as a stable condition, with modest populations of grouse (often hidden from predators in willow thickets) and a rich variety of other species.

== Moorland management ==
=== Draining ===
Large areas of grouse moor were previously blanket bogs, where sphagnum moss is the dominant vegetation, and drainage is required to allow heather to flourish. Drainage can damage these bogs.

=== Burning ===
To ensure a mosaic of heather of different ages, gamekeepers carry out controlled burning of the vegetation, targeting patches of heather between 1 October and 15 April. A burned patch of heather allows for the growth of fresh shoots which provide essential nutrition for grouse. Burning also prevents the accumulation of dry plant matter.

Heather burning is typically carried out in a patchwork pattern, ensuring a variety of heather heights, on a rotational basis spanning between eight and twelve years. While the new-growth heather shoots provide a source of sustenance for the grouse, the older, taller growth provides them with cover and shelter. As a result of this land management practice unique to the UK, heather moorland is a globally unusual habitat. (The claim that 75% of the world's heather moorland is found in the UK is contested and has been shown to be unsubstantiated.) 60% of all England's upland Sites of Special Scientific Interest are managed for grouse shooting. UK moorlands and blanket bogs are a carbon sink and opponents to burning heather argue that it can release this carbon. However, proponents argue that in a controlled burn only the heather is burnt and that the charcoal from burned heather is stored in the soil.

Heather burning, if not carried out properly, can have negative effects on peat hydrology, peat chemistry and physical properties, river water chemistry and river ecology. Moor burning reduces the growth of Sphagnum moss and the density of macroinvertebrates which play a vital role in aquatic food webs by feeding on algae, microbes and detritus at the base of food chains before they themselves are consumed by birds, fish and amphibians. Burning also reduces the water content of the upper layers of peat, making it less able to retain minerals that are essential for plant growth and resisting the chemical effects of acid rain.

In an effort to mitigate the adverse ecological effects caused by burning, some moorland estates managed for grouse shooting have agreed to abstain from burning over protected blanket bogs, where fires dry out and burn the peat. However, some burning of these areas continues. If a moorland has not been burned for several years, large stands of rank and woody heather accumulate, increasing the risk of large fires in dry ground conditions due to the high fuel loads. Larger wildfires tend to be more intense and are more likely to burn the underlying peat. This risk is limited to long-established, unnatural heather moorland that is actively burned; wildfires are very rare in the corresponding mosaic biome of southern Sweden.

=== Mowing ===
Mechanical mowing has been trialled to achieve the same objective of regenerating heather. Mowing produces only one-seventieth as much overall carbon dioxide emissions as burning but costs about six times more.

=== Killing predators ===
Grouse moors have a nearly 200-year history of killing large numbers of predators, including many species that are now protected. Burning and predator control correlate with higher densities of red grouse, as well as some other species that can thrive on open heather moorland; golden plover, curlew, lapwing, common redshank and ring ouzel. The RSPB's Investigations Team reports that in 2017, despite large areas of suitable habitat, not a single hen harrier chick was produced on a privately owned grouse moor. Illegal killing of raptors on grouse moors is widespread.

A 2017 study commissioned by Scottish Natural Heritage into the fate of satellite-tracked golden eagles concluded that "Corroborative information points to the perpetrators of the persecution of tagged eagles being associated with some grouse moors in the central and eastern Highlands of Scotland," and that "[t]his illegal killing has such a marked effect on the survival rates of the young birds that the potential capacity for the breeding golden eagle population continues to be suppressed around where this persecution largely occurs."

The Langholm Moor Demonstration Project prevented the persecution of raptors, especially hen harriers, and found that grouse would survive in the presence of a more natural number of predators. However, raptor predation at Langholm reduced autumn grouse abundance by 50%, making organized driven grouse shooting unprofitable. A community land project now hopes to purchase much of the land in question. The Langholm experiment suggests that, to be profitable, intensive grouse moors need to be predator-controlled. The RSPB reports that there appears to be a "background of illegal persecution" of raptors on British grouse moors.

Shooting and poisoning are not the only methods used to kill predators. Illegal snares have been used to kill predators on grouse moors; Spring and rail traps are widely used and can kill a variety of protected species. Snares placed to trap foxes have even injured humans.

In November 2020, the Scottish Government announced that self-regulation and attempts to curb undesirable practices had failed. Individual estate employees who kill protected species are committing a criminal offence, but their employers, the shooting companies, are not. Requiring companies to obtain a license, on condition that they cease undesirable practices, has been suggested as a way of providing effective protection for predators.

The Scottish Government is to begin work on new legislation that will impose a strict licensing regime on Scottish grouse moors and control raptor persecution, moorland burning, and mass medication with medicated grit. A joint industry statement responded that Scotland already had the strictest anti-persecution measures in the UK, with incidents falling, and that further regulation risked closing down grouse moors, with economic losses for gamekeepers and vulnerable rural businesses.

=== Killing mountain hares ===
Mountain hares may be hosts for ticks and for louping ill virus, both of which they can share with red grouse (and with deer). To control tick-borne diseases, some game managers have recommended culling mountain hares. The only study that has been used to support this policy had no meaningful control group, used potentially confounding treatments, and there were no deer in the study area. A recent study found no effects of mountain hare abundance on number of ticks on grouse, and actually found better grouse chick survival in areas with greater numbers of mountain hares. The Scottish Parliament voted in June 2020 to protect mountain hares; it will be an offence under the Wildlife and Countryside Act to intentionally or recklessly kill or injure a hare without a licence.

== Economics and employment ==
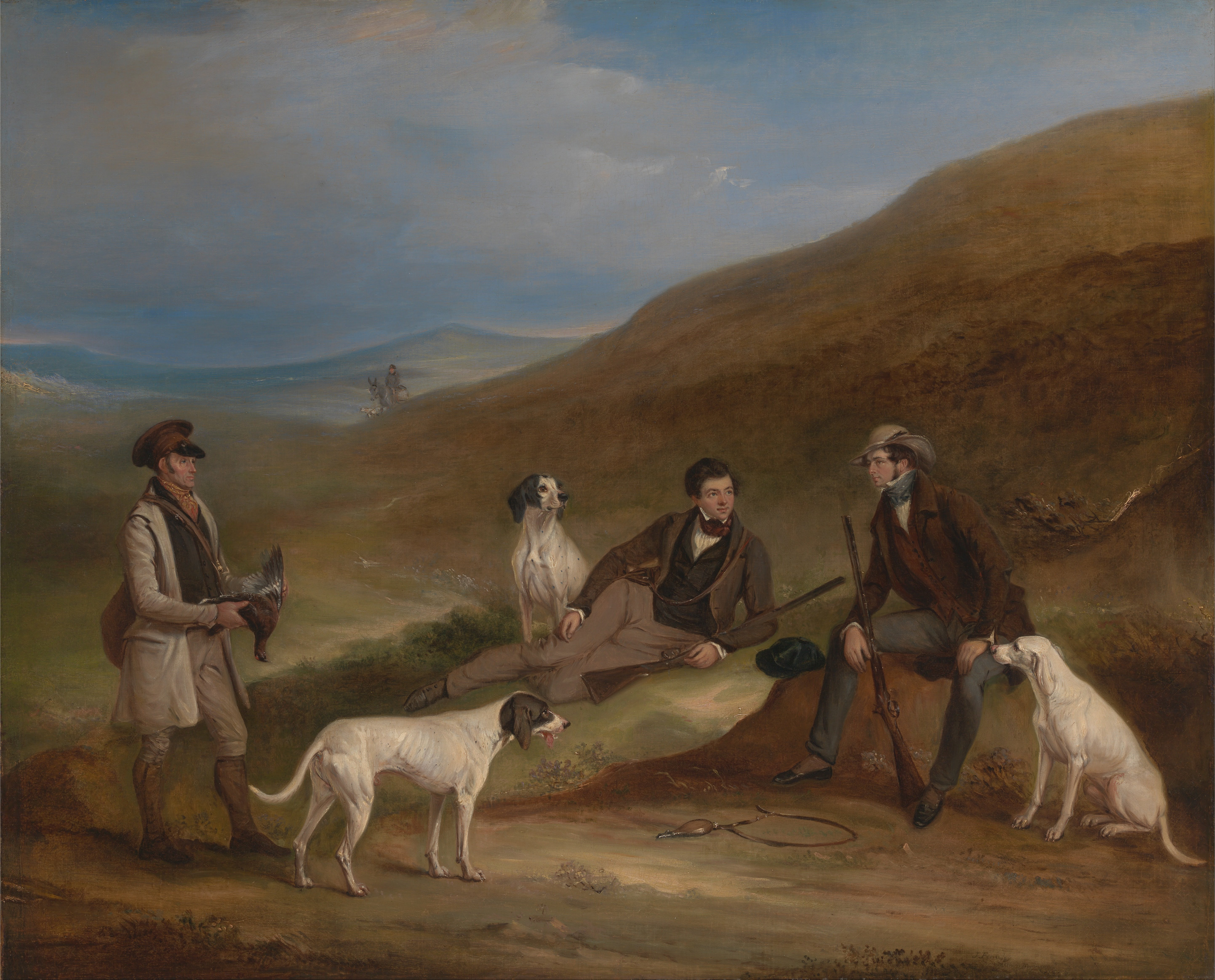
Grouse shooting scene in Yorkshire – 1836 painting by John Fearnley

Grouse shooting supports the equivalent of 2,592 full-time jobs in England, Wales and Scotland, some 1,772 of which are in actual moorland management. The Moorland Association estimates the total economic value of the grouse shooting industry at around £67 million a year. However, this is supported by millions of pounds in subsidies. The small village of Blanchland, Northumberland (population 140) is a centre for grouse shooting in England; 55 per cent of its inhabitants are either directly or indirectly involved in grouse shooting.

Grouse shooting is not directly eligible for government subsidy, but the land on which it takes place is considered to be agricultural grazing land and therefore eligible for the Basic Farm Payment. The total amount of government funding paid to grouse moor owners is therefore difficult to estimate accurately. Estimates have circulated in the press as high as £85 million but a more realistic assessment is around £11 million in 2018.

The profitability of grouse shooting is threatened by both climate change and disease outbreaks. There has been a long-term decline in red grouse numbers. Weather conditions in recent years have led to a shortage of grouse numbers, forcing the cancellation of grouse shooting in some places. This has led landowners in upland areas to substitute pheasant and partridge shooting for grouse shooting, with an increased risk of disease spreading from rear-and-release pheasants and partridge to nearby red grouse.

=== Opposition to driven grouse shooting ===
The practices associated with driven grouse shooting have been criticized by many conservation groups for damaging moorland habitats and for illegally persecuting predators, particularly the hen harrier, which preys on grouse chicks. The RSPB has called for shooting to be licensed, and former RSPB Conservation Director Dr Mark Avery launched a petition calling for the practice to be banned. By the time it closed on 21 September 2016, the petition had gathered 123,077 signatures, triggering a parliamentary debate on the practice, held in Westminster Hall on 31 October 2016. "Because most of our birds evolved in wooded mosaic habitats, grouse moors, being burned and treeless, with just a fraction of native food plants, stifle most wildlife – most of the time."

=== Alternative land uses ===
The main alternatives proposed are:

==== Rewilding, with ecotourism ====
Describing Scotland's grouse moors as 'impoverished', the Revive Coalition suggests that increasing woodland and scrub cover and restoring functioning bogs could result in an upland landscape consisting of a mosaic of woodland, scrub and open habitats. This would support a greater abundance and diversity of wildlife, provide improved ecosystem services, be more resilient to environmental change, pests and disease, and provide diverse resources and income sources for local people.

However, the practice of rewilding has encountered opposition from shooting organizations. The chief executive of Scottish Land and Estates, which represents many grouse moor owners, said: "It is recommending a complete change in the landscape of Scotland. The bonnie purple heather will give way to an unmanaged vista of scrub and scarce wildlife."

In recent years, some large estates, including grouse moors, have been managed to restore the land to a more natural mosaic of habitats. Ecotourism is often a component, and continued shooting, especially of deer, which prevent tree regrowth and have no natural predators in modern Britain, is often essential. The Mar Lodge Estate aims to regenerate woodland including Caledonian forest. Cairngorms Connect has a 200-year vision of restoring woodland to its natural limits, including high altitude montane woodlands, restoring blanket bog and forest bogs and restoring natural processes to river floodplains. These restoration projects are intended to bring benefits to people: reducing flood risk, storing carbon, and providing homes for more wildlife and great places for people to visit. Anders Holch Povlsen's "Wildland" plans for his Scottish estate, some 390 square kilometres in 2019, include restoring their parts of the Highlands "to their former magnificent natural state and repair the harm that man has inflicted on them". This vision includes not just the land itself, but also its many vulnerable buildings and communities. The Rothiemurchus Forest has not been managed for grouse and presents a patchwork of woods, bogs, and heather with rich wildlife. Alladale Wilderness Reserve, Creag Meagaidh, and Glen Affric are further examples of successful management of Scottish wildlife. Scottish Natural Heritage estimates that nature-based tourism in Scotland was worth £1.4 billion and supported 39,000 jobs in 2018.

==== Intensive production of timber ====
Plantations of Sitka spruce are almost the only form of intensive forestry that is economically viable in much of the British uplands – though not all. They support very little wildlife.

==== Minimal management, sheep grazing ====
A former grouse moor in Berwyn, Wales, was allowed to fall out of management in the 1990s. As a result, heather was replaced by rank, ungrazed grass, and relatively few animal species moved in to replace the grouse. The lack of management also led to a proliferation of predator populations, especially of crows and foxes. The species that specifically benefitted from grouse moor management experienced significant local population declines: within 20 years, lapwing became extinct at the site, golden plover declined by 90 per cent, and curlew declined by 79 per cent.
