= British Association for Shooting and Conservation =

Registered society in the United Kingdom

- Established: 1908
- Type: Industrial and provident society
- Headquarters: Rossett, Wrexham, Wales
- Region served: United Kingdom
- Publication: Shooting and Conservation
- Employees: 137 (2023)
- Website: basc.org.uk

The British Association for Shooting and Conservation (BASC) is a registered society under the Co-operative and Community Benefit Societies Act 2014, whose mission is to promote and protect sporting shooting and the well-being of the countryside throughout the United Kingdom and overseas. It has a membership of over 150,000. Its magazine Shooting and Conservation had an average circulation of around 135,000 in 2017.

Sporting shooting includes wildfowling, game, and rough shooting, deer stalking, target shooting and air gunning, pigeon shooting and pest control, gundogs and promoting practical habitat conservation. BASC is also involved in the political representation of shooting, training and the setting of standards in shooting sports and the association undertakes research in its area of interest.

== History ==
=== WAGBI ===
BASC began as the Wildfowlers Association of Great Britain and Ireland (WAGBI), founded by Stanley Duncan, an engineer and gun shop owner from Hull, in 1908. Duncan was a wildfowler and naturalist who feared for the future of wildfowling which was under threat from attempts to control the foreshore. He was also concerned to protect coastal habitats to preserve wildfowl and defend shooting from "protectionist extremists" wishing to ban the sport. The first president was Sir Ralph Payne-Gallwey, a notable Victorian and Edwardian sportsman and author of several books on shooting. Duncan remained the secretary of WAGBI until 1946. Duncan was also a member of the Zoological Society.

For his fowling expeditions Duncan stayed at the Black Hut on Patrington Haven on the Humber. The first WAGBI meeting was held in an hotel in Hull. The Black Hut was allegedly washed away by a big tide in 1969 but was more likely destroyed by a digger clearing the site.

Following this, WAGBI appointed its first full-time director, a former naval officer and Liverpool businessman, Commander John Anderton, who summed up his agenda as "doing one's best for something one likes – backed by the conviction that what one is doing is right." Under Anderton WAGBI focused its efforts on raising standards among wildfowlers and establishing a network of wildfowling clubs to preserve local shooting and maintain records of wildfowl populations.

In 1975 the Gamekeepers Association merged with WAGBI and in 1977, the association was a founding member of FACE, the federation for shooting sports in the European Union.

=== BASC ===
In addition, shooting had become more open with individuals pursuing several forms of the sport. The change of name to the British Association for Shooting and Conservation (BASC) was agreed at the Annual General Meeting in 1981 in recognition that shooting sports required a single representative body and that WAGBI was the most suitably placed organisation to take on the role.

== Modern day ==
BASC is a representative body for shooting sports and is a registered society under the Co-operative and Community Benefit Societies Act 2014. Each member has one share in the association. BASC is governed by a council elected from the members. The council is advised by a series of committees for Scotland, Wales, Northern Ireland, game shooting, deer stalking and wildfowling.

Marford Mill, the association's headquarters, was acquired in 1976. The property is a former water mill at Rossett, in Wrexham. Among the collections held by BASC at the headquarters are firearms such as Irish Tom, a punt gun of unusual length and bore and Col. Peter Hawker's double punt gun.

The association has country offices in Scotland, Wales and Northern Ireland as well as four English regional directors and their staff based in the North, Central, the South East and the South West.

While the main purpose of the association is the protection and promotion of country shooting and its associated conservation activities, BASC also runs the wildfowling permit scheme, deer stalking schemes and the Goshooting initiative which links those looking for a shooting opportunity with those providing them. Members can also request advice from BASC's expert staff on issues involving shooting and firearms certification and licensing, land management and gamekeeping.

Other projects include Green Shoots, which links members to local biodiversity plans; Young Shots, which seeks to educate young people about field sports; and Taste of Game which promotes game meat. BASC is a signatory to the Code of Good Shooting Practice and produces a series of codes of practice on aspects of shooting.

In politics BASC operates on an all-party basis and they ensured that shooting was not damaged by the Hunting Act 2004, preserved the legal right for young people to continue to go shooting with airguns, where they have the permission of the landowner, and secured an exemption from the ban on the cosmetic docking of dogs tails for working gundogs.

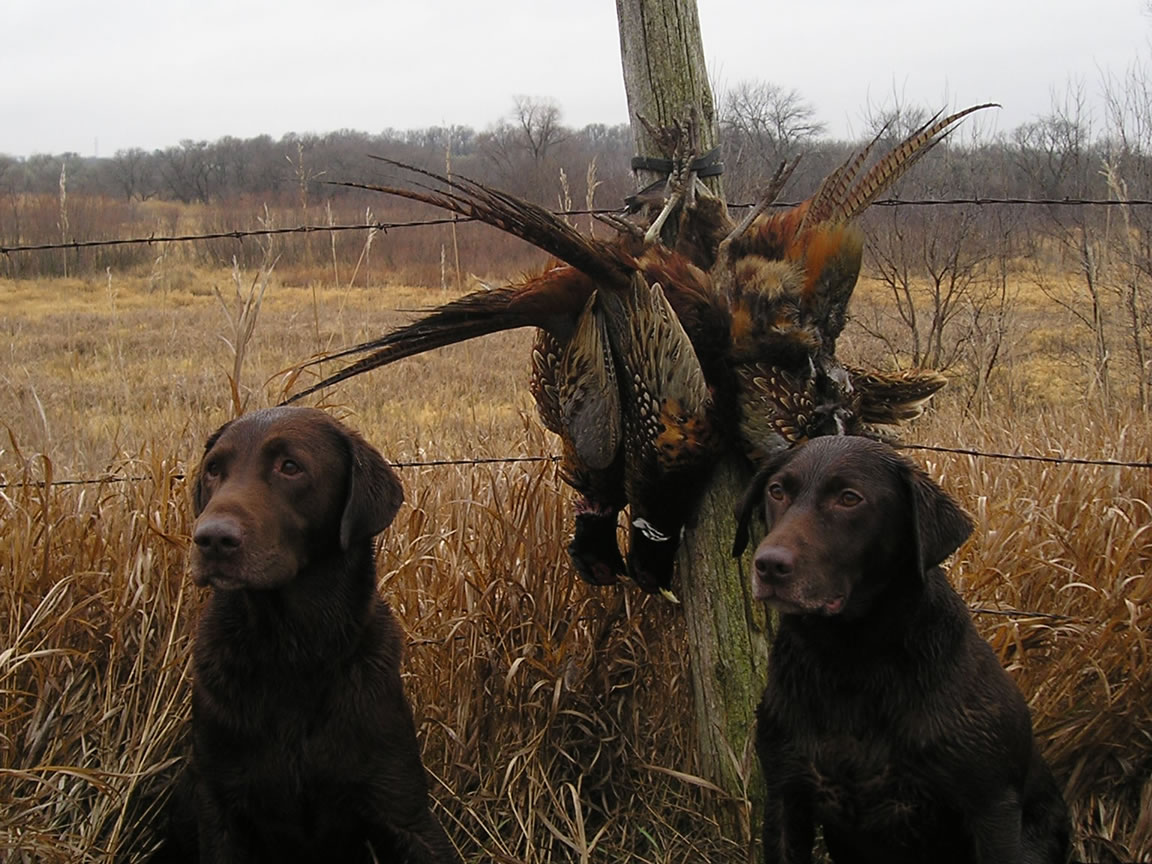
Hunting dogs with catch

The patron of the association was Prince Philip, Duke of Edinburgh, who held the office from 1967 till 2021. Princess Anne accepted an invitation to succeed her father as Patron in October 2022.

Richard Ali succeeded John Swift as chief executive of the association in 2013, a position he held until March 2017, when the association announced his dismissal due to gross misconduct. BASC has announced that Ian Bell took over as chief executive in February 2018.

BASC has in the past opposed attempts to ban the use of lead shot, despite the stance of its former chief executive, arguing that further restrictions do not have a robust evidence base and that compliance with the law and proper processing of game meat manages the risks. In February 2020, BASC, alongside eight other shooting and rural organisations, announced a voluntary five-year transition away from lead shot and single-use plastics for live quarry shooting. The statement claimed significant recent advances in technology has enabled the transition to take place. Despite this, in June 2020 BASC strongly opposed EU legislation to restrict the use of lead shot around wetlands. A year into the transition, a study found that of 180 birds tested, 179 were shot with lead.

== See also ==
- Driven grouse shooting
- Game & Wildlife Conservation Trust
- Game (food)
- Gamekeeper
- Hunting in the United Kingdom
- Wildfowling
- Wildlife management
- Firearm regulation in the United Kingdom
