= Raptor persecution =

Abuse of birds of prey

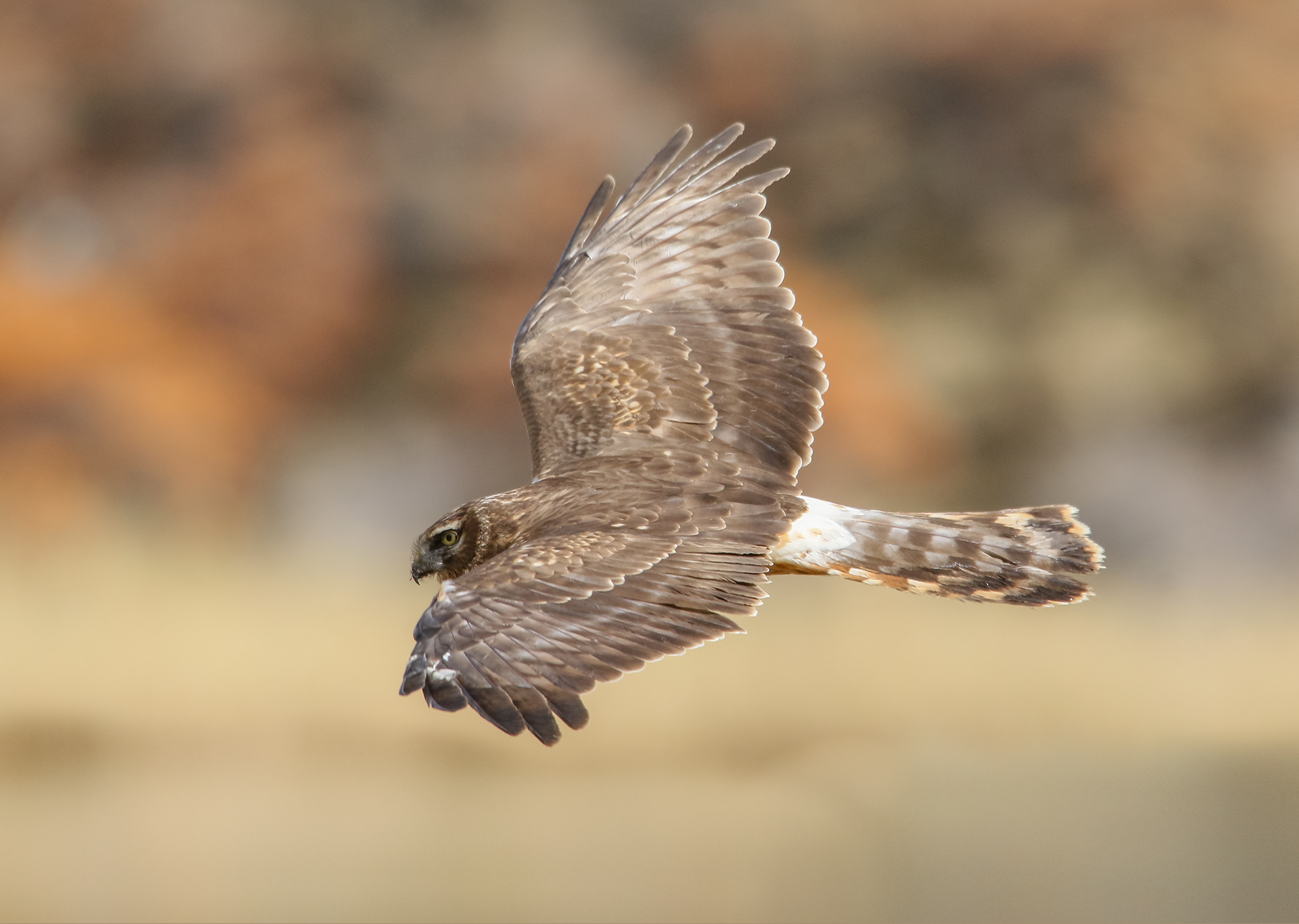
Hen Harrier, Circus cyaneus

In the United Kingdom, raptor persecution is a crime against wildlife. The offence includes poisoning, shooting, trapping, and nest destruction or disturbance of birds of prey.

== International context ==
There is a long history of game bird shooting and hunting for sport, and the international trafficking of wildlife products, including raptors and raptor feathers, is a billion-dollar industry. Understanding and suppressing raptor persecution is complex, because the reasons behind it are shaped by local, cultural and historic conditions.

In some countries raptors are hunted for use in falconry. In China, people capture eagles and other raptors for falconry festivals that attract tourists. In Germany, buzzards and hawks are at risk, and the red kite is endangered. In the European Union, the EU Birds Directive (Council Directive 79/409/EEC 1979) regulates the hunting of all wild birds, stating that they must not be caught, killed or persecuted (with the exception of proper hunting). Campaigning groups in Germany have identified hunting and poaching hotspots on migratory routes across the continent. Persecution increased across Europe during the COVID-19 Pandemic.

== United Kingdom ==
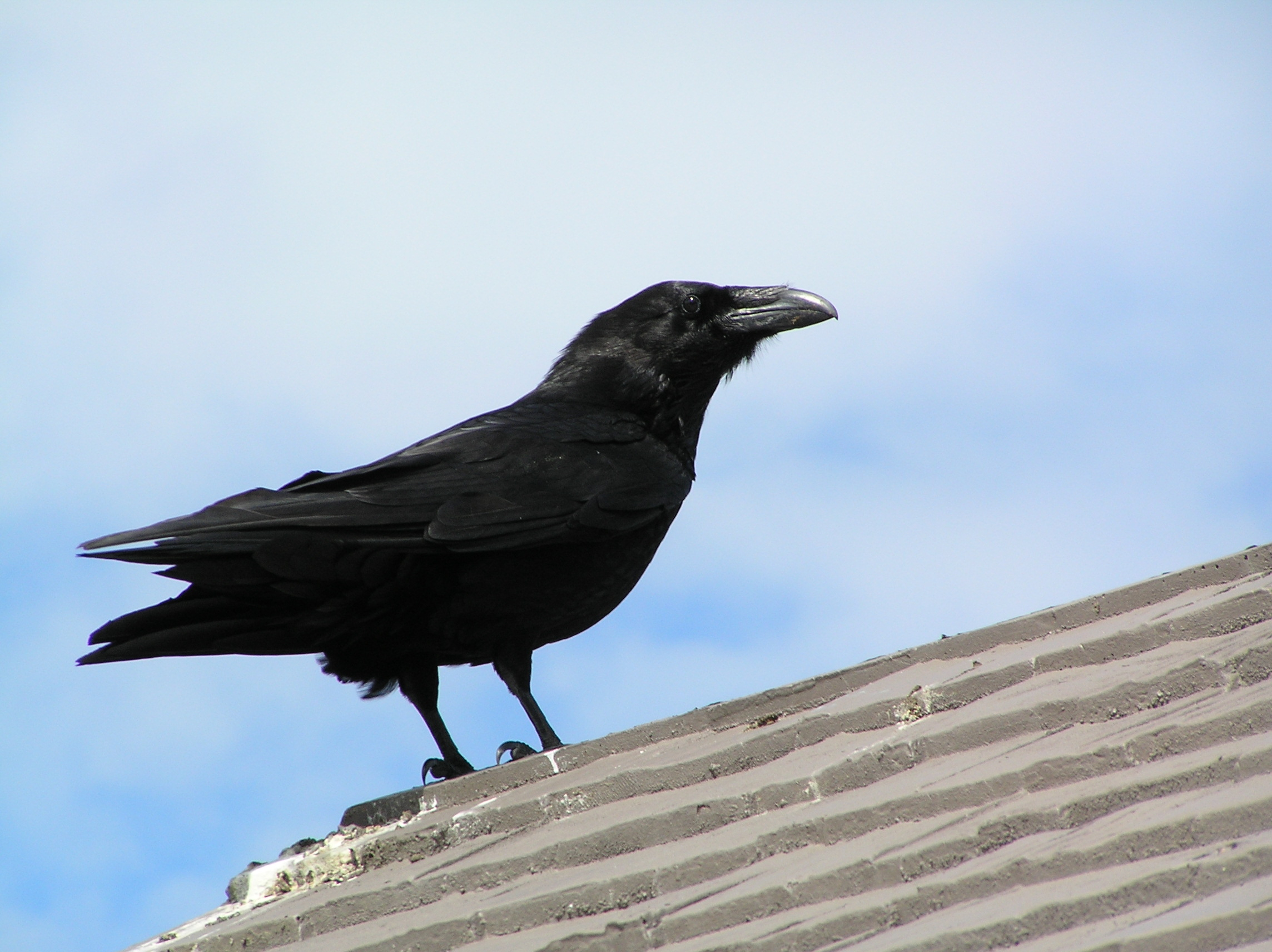
Raven

Birds of prey are protected species in the United Kingdom, and criminal offences against them are covered by the Wildlife and Countryside Act 1981. But it is a crime that is difficult to monitor, due to the remoteness of many of the areas in which the birds live and cultural and social pressures in certain sectors of the rural community which discourage reporting. Incidents of egg thefts and illegal killings of birds of prey, including red kites, peregrine falcons and barn owls, increased in England during the lockdown periods of the COVID-19 pandemic as the absence of the public emboldened gamekeepers and miscreants. In Wales, however, the number of offences has decreased, as egg thefts have fallen dramatically there.

The Royal Society for the Protection of Birds (RSPB) began recording raptor persecution in 1990. Their Birdcrime report covers known offences against birds of prey. The report describes this crime as widespread and relentless, but results in very few convictions. In 2020 the RSPB confirmed 137 incidents. Many of the confirmed incidents occurred on land managed for gamebird shooting.

The Scottish Raptor Monitoring Scheme works to improve co-operation between organisations involved in raptor monitoring in Scotland. Founded in 1980, The Scottish Raptor Study Group monitor and record the fortunes of raptor species across Scotland. Since 2002 they have produced an annual report. In the Scottish Raptor Monitor Scheme common ravens are included as honorary raptors because they are ecologically similar.

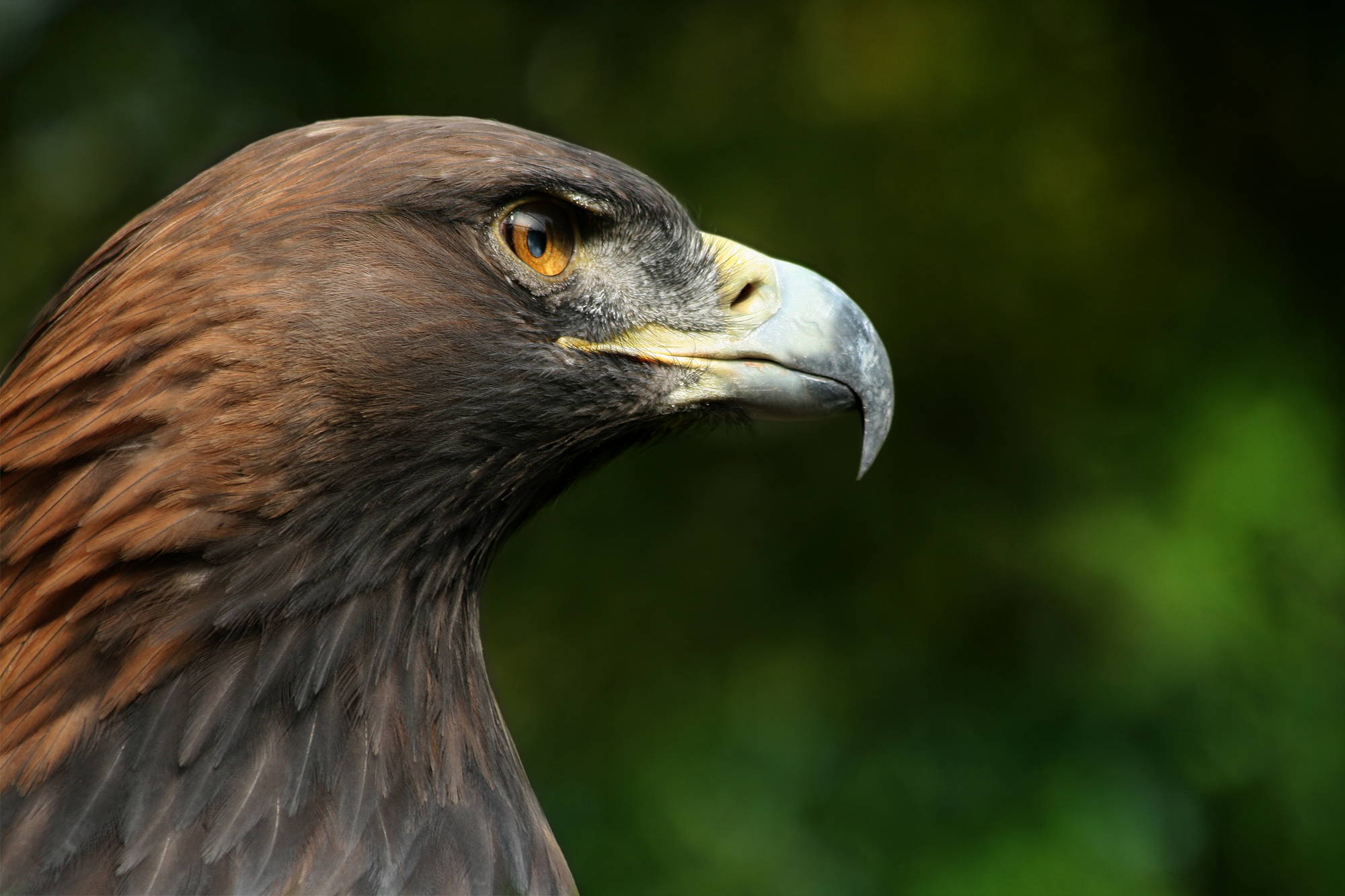
Golden eagle

Golden eagles are being reintroduced in southern Scotland.

North Yorkshire has particularly high raptor persecution levels. The survival of the hen harrier in the UK is of particular concern as one of Britain's most endangered birds because of illegal persecution. Hen harriers share space with grouse, and research shows that hen harriers fare best on those estates with no shooting interests. The interests of conservationists often clash with gamekeepers and landowners.

The Welsh Government began funding an RSPB Raptor Officer in 2020.

The Police Service of Northern Ireland investigate incidents in relation to the Wildlife (Northern Ireland) Order 1985 and the Wildlife & Natural Environment Act (Northern Ireland) 2011. No-one has ever been successfully prosecuted for raptor persecution offences in Northern Ireland.

In 2020 the British Association for Shooting and Conservation and other country sports groups including the Countryside Alliance, the Moorland Association, the National Gamekeepers' Organisation declared "zero tolerance" against raptor persecution.

In June 2023 the Guardian newspaper published details of raptor persecution allegations pertaining to the Royal estate at Sandringham.

In January 2024 Scottish news highlighted cases of peregrine laundering from Scotland to the Middle East
