= Otterhound =

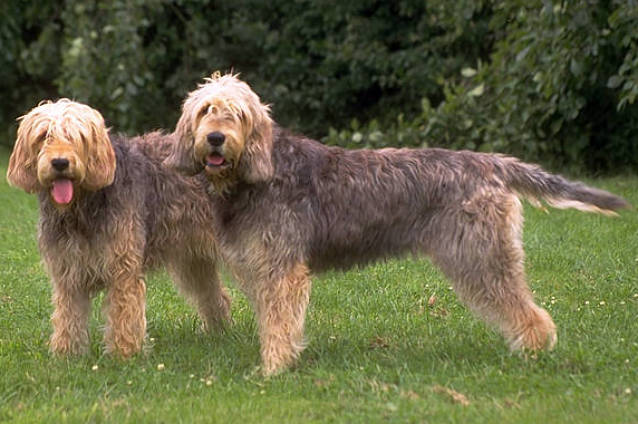
- Otterhounds
- Origin: England
Traits
| Height | Males | 69 cm (27 in) |
| | Females | 61 cm (24 in) |
| Weight | Males | 115 pounds (52 kg) |
| | Females | 80 pounds (36 kg) |
- Coat: Double, with a soft undercoat and longer harsher outer coat. Both coats are slightly oily. Medium length and moderately curly.
- Colour: Whole coloured, grizzle, sandy, red, wheaten, blue; in combination with slight white markings on extremities. White in combination with slight lemon, blue or badger pied markings. Black and tan, blue and tan, black and cream, occasional liver, tan and liver, tan and white.
Kennel club standards
- The Kennel Club: standard
- Fédération Cynologique Internationale: standard

The Otterhound is an English dog breed. It is a scent hound and is currently recognised by the Kennel Club as a Vulnerable Native Breed with around 600 animals worldwide.

== Ancestry ==
The first recorded Otterhounds known to resemble the current breed are in the North-West of England in the first half of the 19th century – for example, the Hawkstone Otter Hunt and Squire Lomax's Otterhounds. In the second half of the 19th century, French Griffons were outcrossed, including one-eighth Wolf cross/Griffon Vendéen from the Comte de Canteleu in Normandy. In the early 20th century the Griffon Nivernais was crossed into the breed, and one particular dog, Boatman, a Grand Griffon Vendéen/Bloodhound cross, became an ancestor for several kennels.

== Appearance ==
The Otterhound is a large, rough coated, and straight limbed dog. The head is deep but not wide with the rough coat giving it a beard or moustache of sorts. The nose is wide. The eyes are deep set with the haw only slightly showing. The ears are long and pendulous, they roll inwards as to create a 'drape' appearance. The neck is long a slight dewlap is allowed. The forelegs are straight from the elbow to the ground. Pasterns are slightly strung. Hind legs are well-muscled with heavily muscled thighs, in a normal stance the hind legs from hock to ground are perpendicular. Feet are large, round, and thick padded. The tail is thick at the base and never curls over the back. The coat is 4–8 cm (1.6–3.1 in) in length, dense, rough, and waterproof; appears broken. Height at the shoulder is 69 cm (27 in) for dogs and 61 cm (24 in) for bitches. Otterhounds generally weigh between 80 and 115 pounds (36 and 52 kg).

=== Coat colours ===
Recognised colours are: whole coloured, grizzle, sandy, red, wheaten, and blue; with white markings permissible in all of them as well as lemon, blue, or badger pied markings.

== Hunting ==
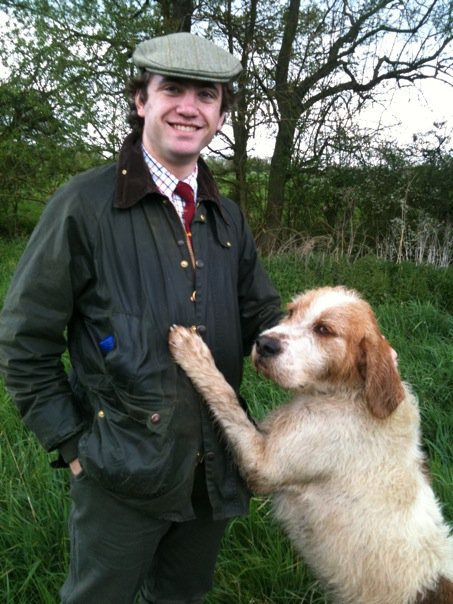
A mink hunter with an otterhound

Otter hunting dates back to the early medieval period, with references to it found as early as 1360. The Otterhound, however, can only be traced back as a distinct breed as far as the 18th century, and the first record of Otterhounds at a dog show was in Leeds in 1861. To be equal to the otter, an Otterhound was said to need "a Bulldog's courage, a Newfoundland's strength in water, a Pointer's nose, a Retriever's sagacity, the stamina of a Foxhound, the patience of a Beagle, and the intelligence of a Collie."

In 1978, due to the dramatic decline in otter numbers, the otter was placed on the list of protected species in Britain, and otter hunting therefore ceased. By 1977, nine registered packs of otterhounds were still in existence. A few hunts switched to hunting mink or coypu, but many of the original otterhound packs ceased to exist altogether. Hounds were often passed to newly founded minkhound packs. The Pembroke and Carmarthenshire Minkhounds are the only pack today with a pure otterhound pack. As the dogs had been selectively bred for their hunting capabilities, only a few of the bloodlines were suitable for breeding into companion animals.

== Health ==
A survey of breed club members in the UK found a life expectancy of 10.21 years. The same survey identified a predisposition to gastric dilatation volvulus with 9% of Otterhounds having the condition and 7.4% of deaths attributable to the condition.

== Endangered breed ==
In 2012 it was estimated there were around 600 otterhounds in the world. It is considered to be the most endangered native breed in Britain, with only 41 new registrations in 2016. This is partly because otterhounds have never been numerous, and even in the early 20th century, when otter hunting as a sport was at the height of its popularity, the number of dogs was still small. They are on the list of Vulnerable Native Breeds as identified by the UK Kennel Club, and great efforts are being made to save the breed.

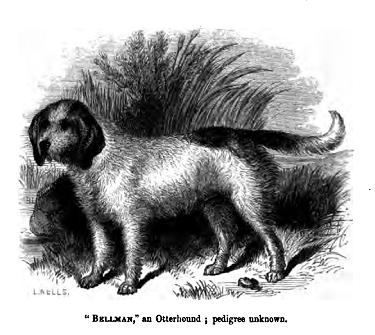
An Otterhound, published in 1859

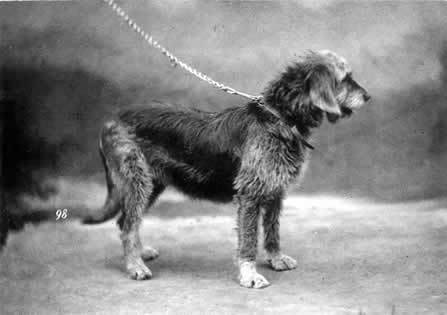
Otterhound 1879

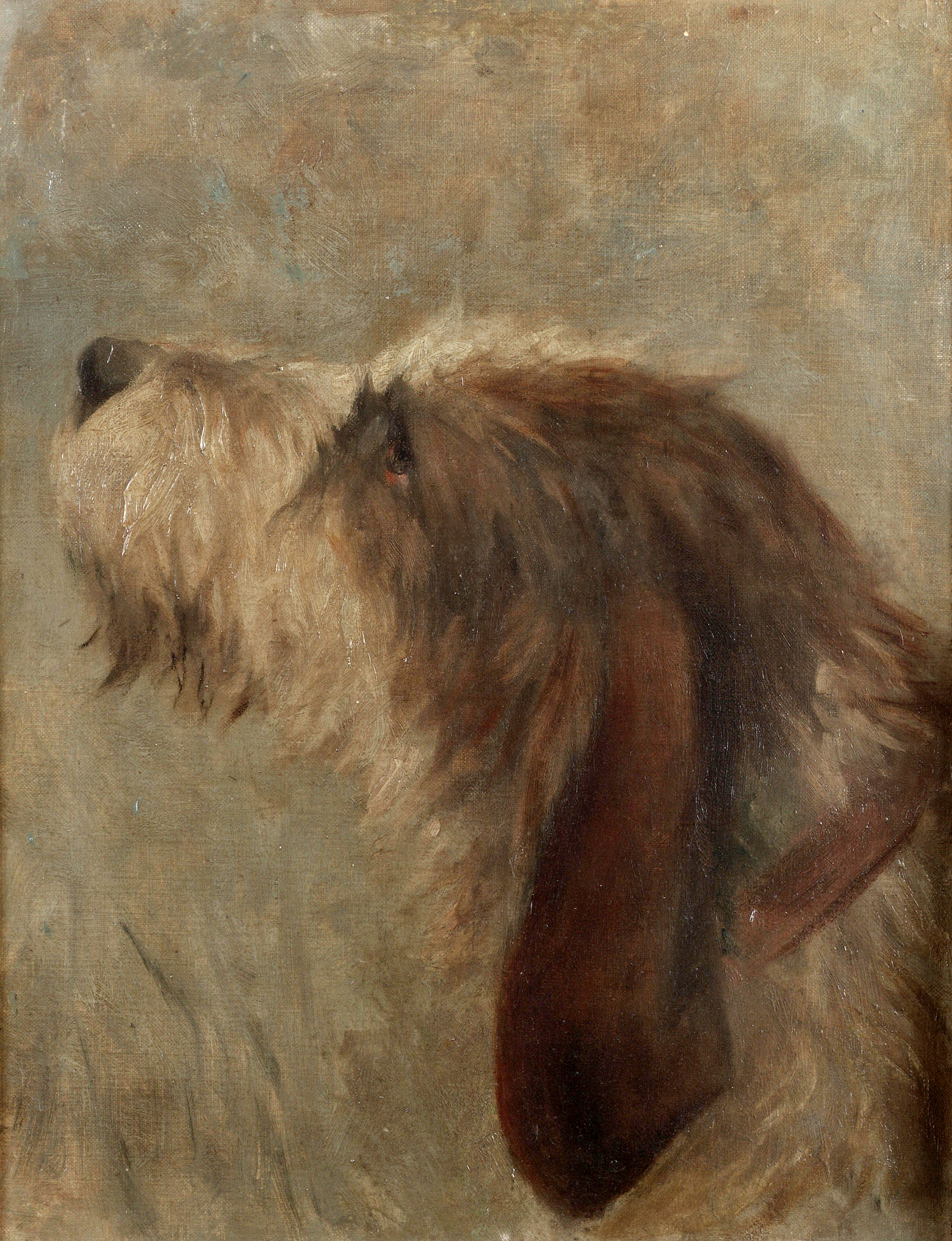
Otterhound by Frances C. Fairman, circa 1900

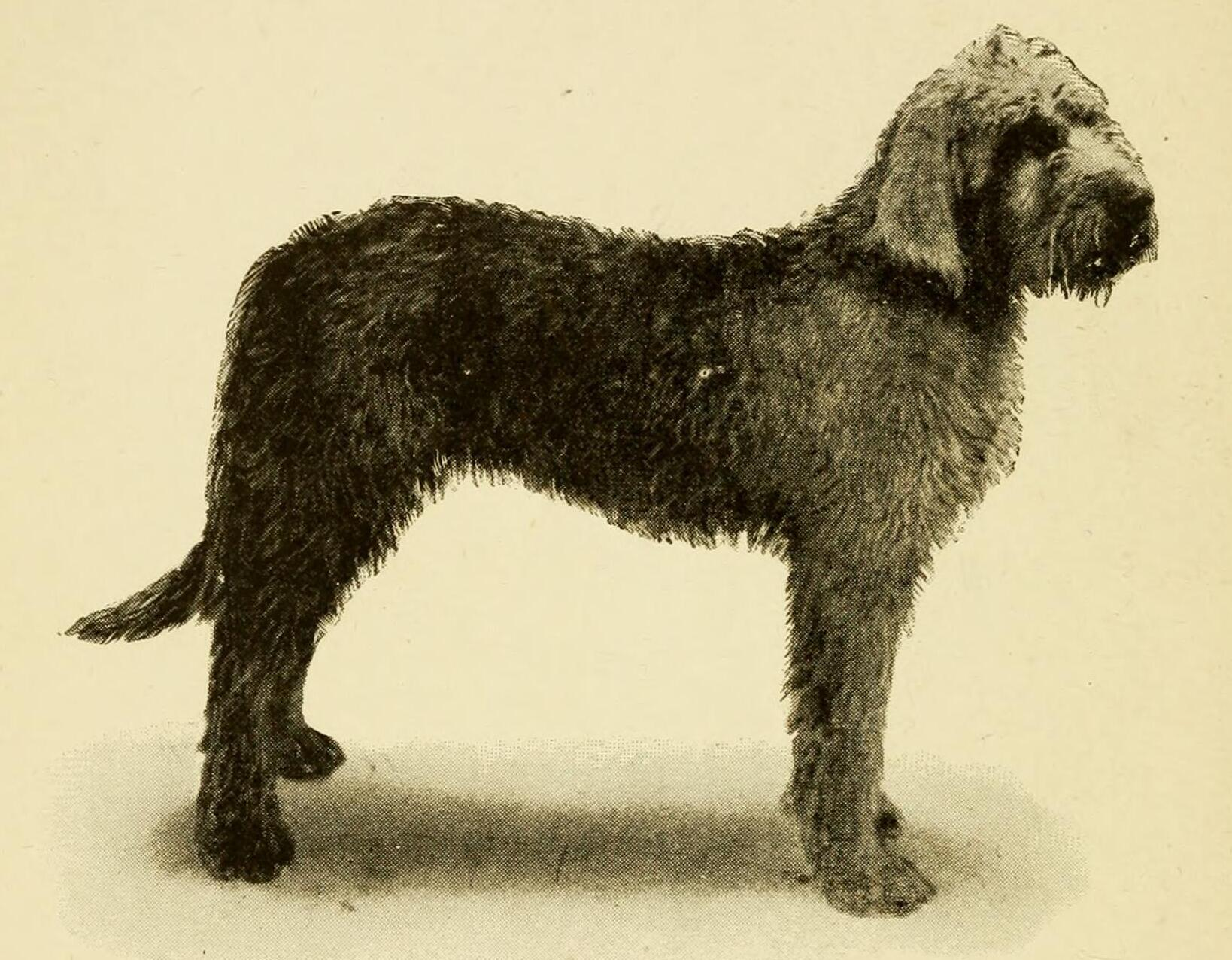
1908 illustration of a Dumfriesshire Otterhound

== See also ==
- List of dog breeds
