= Pheasant shooting =

Hunting sport

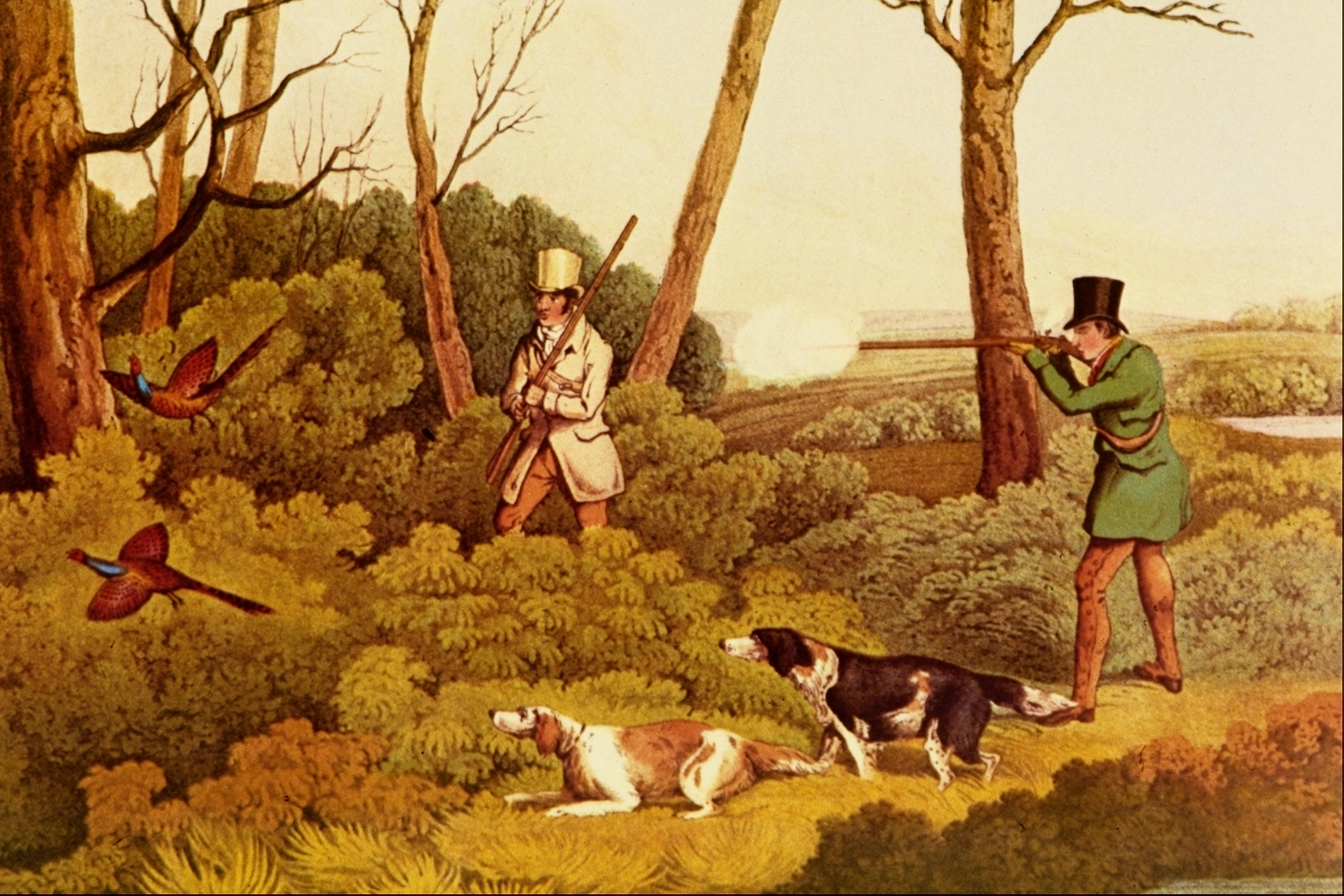
Pheasant Shooting, a painting by Henry Thomas Alken (1785–1881)

Pheasant shooting is the activity of shooting the common pheasant. It takes place primarily in the United Kingdom, but is also practised in other parts of the world. The shooting of game birds is carried out using a shotgun, often 12 and 20 bore or a .410, sometimes on land managed by a gamekeeper.

== United Kingdom ==
The common pheasant was first introduced to Great Britain many centuries ago, but was rediscovered as a game bird in the 1830s. It is reared extensively in captivity, and around 47 million pheasants are released each year on shooting estates, mainly in England, although most released birds survive less than a year in the wild.

The numbers of captive-reared pheasants released have risen sharply since the 1980s. Natural England has concluded that the released birds threaten native wildlife by increasing predator numbers and creating competition for food. In October 2020 the Department for Environment, Food and Rural Affairs (Defra) announced that a licensing regime would be introduced in 2021 for releases of pheasants within 500m of protected sites.

Pheasants are shot on the traditional formal "driven shoot" principles, whereby guest or paying guns have birds driven over them by beaters, and on smaller "rough shoots" by other methods. The open season in the UK is from 1 October to 1 February, under the Game Act 1831 (1 & 2 Will. 4. c. 32). Generally they are shot by “guns” employing gun dogs to help find, flush, and retrieve shot birds. Retrievers, spaniels, and pointing breeds are used to flush pheasants.

The doggerel "Up gets a guinea, bang goes a penny-halfpenny, and down comes a half a crown" reflects the expensive pastime of 19th century driven shoots in Britain, when pheasants were often shot for pleasure. It was a popular royal pastime in Britain to shoot common pheasants. King George V shot over a thousand pheasants out of a total bag of 3,937 over a six-day period in December 1913 during a competition with a friend, however did not do enough to beat him.

== United States ==
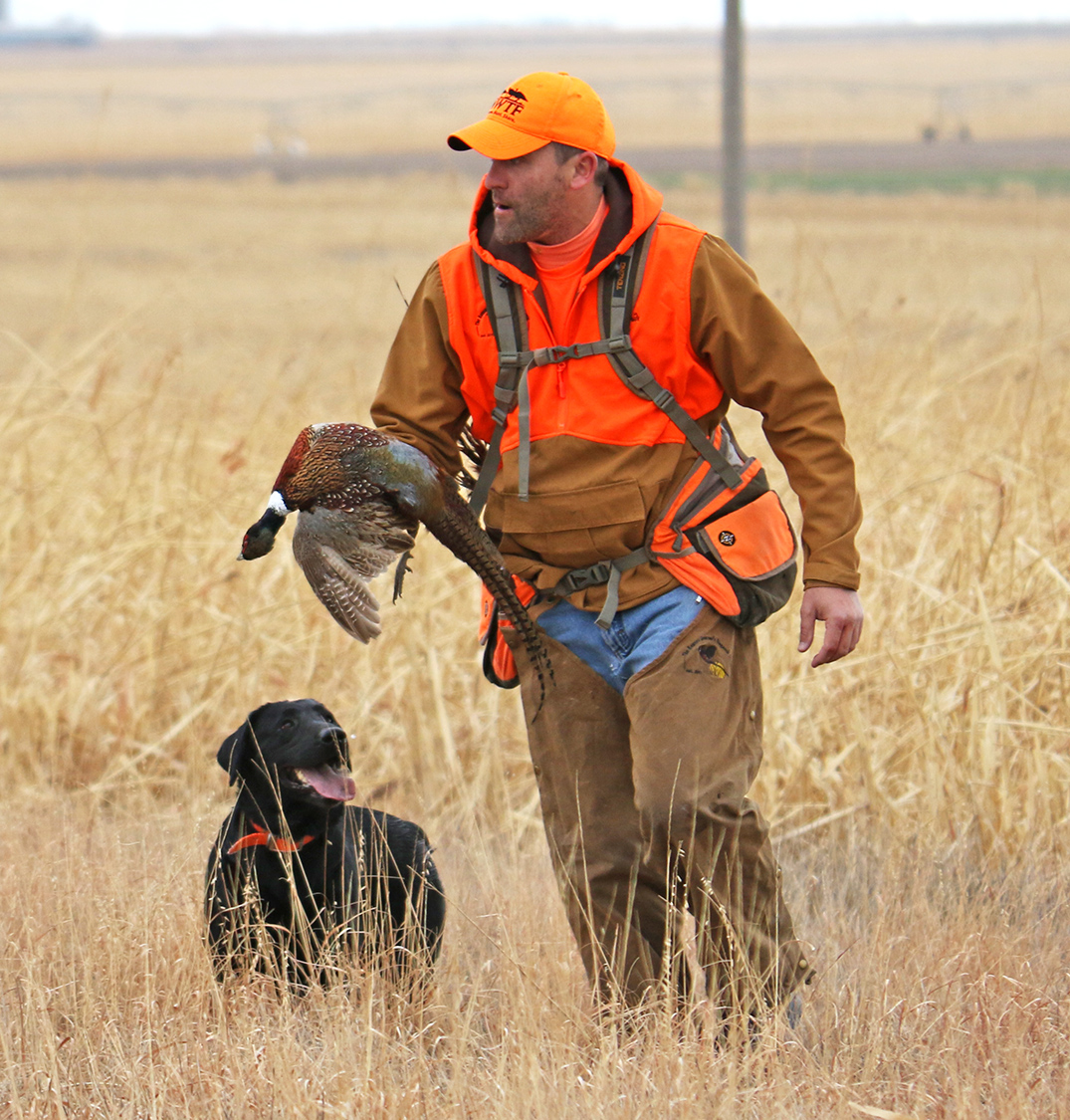
A pheasant hunter in Kansas in 2020

Common pheasants were introduced in North America in 1773 and have become well established throughout much of the Rocky Mountain states (Colorado, Montana, Wyoming, etc.), the Midwest, the Plains states, as well as Canada and Mexico. In the southwest, they can even be seen south of the Rockies in Bosque del Apache National Wildlife Refuge 161 km (100 mi) south of Albuquerque, New Mexico. It is now most common on the Great Plains.

In some states, e.g. Ohio, captive-reared and released birds make up much of the population. The first planted pheasants in the United States were put in the Willamette Valley in Oregon.

Pheasant hunting is popular in much of the U.S., especially in the Great Plains states, where a mix of farmland and native grasslands provides ideal habitat. South Dakota alone has an annual harvest of over a million birds by over 200,000 hunters.

Much of the American hunting is done by groups of hunters, who walk through fields and shoot the birds as they are flushed by dogs such as Labrador Retrievers and Springer Spaniels. There are also many hunters who use Pointers such as English Setters or German Shorthairs to find and hold pheasants for hunters to flush and shoot.

== History ==
The origins of the pheasant in Britain remain a matter of debate, with some accounts attributing its introduction to the Romans, although the Normans also played an important role in its establishment. The earliest documentary evidence dates to 1059, when King Harold granted pheasants to the canons of Waltham Abbey. During the medieval period, pheasants were primarily regarded as luxury food, particularly among the aristocracy, and were commonly served at important feasts.

Pheasant shooting developed from the sixteenth century, initially on a relatively small scale. Birds were commonly walked up over dogs, whereas traditional methods of capture included nets and traps.Shooting birds in flight become more established following the restoration of Charles II in 1660, although it did not become particularly popular until the eighteenth century.

Driven shooting emerged during the nineteenth century, influenced by continental hunting customs. The introduction of breech-loading shotguns in the mid-1850's enabled faster reloading and larger numbers of birds to be shot. Prince Albert helped popularise driven shooting following his marriage to Queen Victoria in 1840, while Edward VII further promoted the sport through his enthusiasm for shooting at Sandringham. During this period, game shooting became closely associated with wealth, social status and the British landed elite.. By 1875, driven pheasent shooting had become a leading filed sport in Britain

The early twentieth century represented a high point for the sport, but the First World War, higher taxation and death duties contributed to the decline of traditional estate shoots. Following the Wolrd war II revovery era large scale driven shooting experienced a revival from the 1960s supported by commercial game farms and privately organised shoots.

== Law and season ==
In England and Wales, the pheasant shooting season runs from 1 October to 1 February, as established under the Game Act of 1831. The Act also prohibits the killing or taking of game on Sundays and Christmas day. Since 31 May 2021, releasing pheasants on protected sites in England, or within 500 meters of their boundaries, has required a licence under the Wildlife and Countryside Act 1981. The Reach (amendment) regulations 2026, which came into force on 1 April 2026, restrict the use and placing on the market of lead shot in England, Wales and Scotland after 1 April 2029, which will subsequently require the use of steel proof guns and steel shots.

== How a driven shoot works ==
A typical driven shoot includes several groups working together. The shooters, known as "guns", stand at numbered positions called pegs, while beaters walk through woodland and cover crops to encourage pheasants to fly towards them. Pikers-up, accompanied by trained dogs, often known as gun dogs, retrieve the birds that have been shot. The game keeper manages the birds, habitat and organisation of the shoot. A full shoot day is generally expected to include at least four or five drives. Guns usually travel between drives together by vehicle, often a dedicated "gun bus". Some shoots stop for lunch and continue shooting in the afternoon, while others "shoot through" until mid afternoon and instead hold a substantial mid morning break, known as elevenses, for food, drink and conversation.

== Scale and economics ==
The number of pheasants released annually in the UK is uncertain, as no comprehensive official recording system exists. Aebischer estimated that approximately 47 million pheasants were released in 2016, with a 95% confidence interval of 39-57 million. However, Madden, using 12 different estimation methods, calculated an average of approximately 31.5 million pheasants annually, indicate the difficulty of establishing an accurate figure. Imports also add to the scale of releases, with more than five million live pheasants and almost 20 million eggs imported in 2019.

The economic contribution of shooting is also disputed. A report commissioned by shooting organisations estimated that the industry contributed £2 billion to the UK economy and supported 74,000 full time equivalent jobs. A 2024 industry commissioned report estimated a contribution of £3.3 billion and 67,000 jobs, although it notes that its figures are not directly comparable with the earlier study. A review by economists at Sheffield Halam University and Cormack Economics, commissioned by the League Against Cruel Sports, challenged the earlier methodology and estimated a contribution of between £267 million and £746 million.

== Cost, imports and recent changes ==
The UK game-shooting industry relies heavily on imports from France, with roughly half of lowland gamebirds reared from French laid eggs. In 2022, avian influenza in France's main game-farming regions disrupted exports, and dozens of shoots cancelled or reduced their seasons, with at least 93 gamekeepers being made redundant. Costs have also risen. The average price charged per pheasant reached £45.81 in the 2022–23 season a 31% increase, and £51.60 per driven pheasant, excluding VAT, by 2026. In February 2025, the fee for a new shotgun certificate rose from £79.50 to £194.00, allowing police to recover their full licensing costs.

== Environmental impact and controversy ==
The environmental effects of pheasant releasing are debated. Released pheasants can damage woodland ground, which recovers only slowly after release pens are abandoned. In August 2020, pheasants made up an estimated 48.8% of Britain's bird biomass. The game and wildlife conservation trust argues that associated management, such as maintaining woodland rides, can benefit wildlife. Lead ammunition is contested: despite a 2020 voluntary pledge to phase it out, 99% of sampled pheasants containing shot in 2024–25 had been killed with lead shot.
