= Trichostrongylus tenuis =

Scientific classification
- Domain: Eukaryota
- Kingdom: Animalia
- Phylum: Nematoda
- Class: Chromadorea
- Order: Rhabditida
- Family: Trichostrongylidae
- Genus: Trichostrongylus
- Species: T. tenuis

Binomial name
- Trichostrongylus tenuis (Mehlis, 1846)

Species of roundworm

Trichostrongylus tenuis, also known as the strongyle worm, is a gut nematode found in the United Kingdom, sensitive to Pyrantel pamoate. Larvae have a short migration inside the mucosa of the intestine and return quickly to the digestive tract.

This endoparasite causes a condition often called strongylosis or 'grouse disease' and which can be the cause of regular crashes in grouse populations. When the adult worm burrows into the caeca walls it causes a lot of damage and internal bleeding which in itself is harmful to the grouse. The worms ultimately reduce the digestive efficiency thus affecting the condition of the grouse. The eggs of the strongyle worm found in the caecal droppings of red grouse, hatch out into a microscopic larvae stage. Living within the dropping they feed off bacteria and organic matter they develop through two moults reaching their third larval stage, 'L3'. The 'L3' larvae is now at its infective stage so it 'swims' up heather stalks, on a thin film of liquid, to the young shoots where it is most likely to be ingested by a host. Once in the body of a host they enter one of the two caecum in the intestine of the host where the larvae develop into adult worms. The adults mate within the caeca and the female can lay over 100 eggs a day which are passed out in the caecal dropping.

The development of the parasite can vary greatly depending on the conditions, namely temperature and humidity. The eggs and larvae can both tolerate periods of low temperature but neither can survive in hot and dry weather. In perfect conditions with high humidity and temperatures exceeding 15 °C most eggs will hatch within 24 hours, compared with at 5 °C where the eggs may take several days to hatch out. The larvae can remain active above 6 °C with relative humidity but when it is colder they halt their development but stay alive. With the climate changing as it is the worms find tolerable conditions for much of the year but they are picked up by grouse at two main periods of the year. The grouse may ingest infective larvae from the heather tips in the summer and early spring. During autumn and winter not all ingested 'L3' larvae will develop into adults, the larvae may begin to moult and temporarily halt their development and attach themselves to the caecum wall, they are said to be in an 'arrested' state. The larvae over-winter in the bird's intestine and in March/April when conditions are more favourable they resume their development.

With age the worm burden in grouse generally increases as each worm in the intestine of the grouse has to be individually ingested and the adult birds appear to have little resistance to the parasite. The burden of worms is obtained when the birds feed on heather and the young birds feed mainly on insects; for this reason this parasite has little direct bearing on chick survival but can badly affect adults and immature birds.

High worm burdens in grouse can lead to mortality and poor condition leading to easy predation and poor reproduction. The strongyle worm burrows into the caecal mucosa which affects the bird's ability to control the scent it emits, making them particularly susceptible to mammalian predators who hunt using scent. High burden leading to poor condition of the hen grouse may not affect the clutch size but can affect her ability to incubate the eggs or brood the chicks so this parasite may indirectly affect chick mortality.
