= Mink hunting =

Mink hunting is a country sport involving the hunting of American mink with scent hounds along the waterways which make up their habitat, in a manner similar to fox hunting. Mink hunting took place in the countryside in the UK and Ireland, but since 2005 traditional mink hunting has been banned in England and Wales.

== Origins ==
When the sport of otter hunting was given up in the British Isles in the late 1970s due to otters becoming endangered, many packs of Otterhounds converted to hunting the invasive American mink, which had become established in Britain from 1950 onward, from fur farm escapees. Unsuccessful efforts to eradicate the mink led to it being widely viewed as an invasive pest in Britain and in Ireland (where a bounty is paid per Mink killed).

== Hunting ==
There are 22 packs of Minkhounds in the UK, registered with the Masters of Minkhounds Association, and four packs in Ireland, registered with the Mink Hounds Association. Mink hunts met once or twice a week over the Summer, from April to October, and drew waterways searching for mink. Followers tried to keep up on foot, which may involve wading across a river. When a mink was found, a chase will ensue, with hounds hunting the scent of the mink until they caught it. It is estimated up to 1,400 mink were killed a year by mink hunts in the UK. Since the 2005 ban, mink hunts in the UK have adapted to the new legislation by undertaking legal trail hunting and other forms of exempt hunting (such as hunting rats).

The hounds used for Minkhunting were usually elderly foxhounds, drafted from foxhound packs, though some packs also used the historic Otterhound breed.

== See also ==
- Fox hunting
- Hunting with hounds
- Hunting Act 2004
