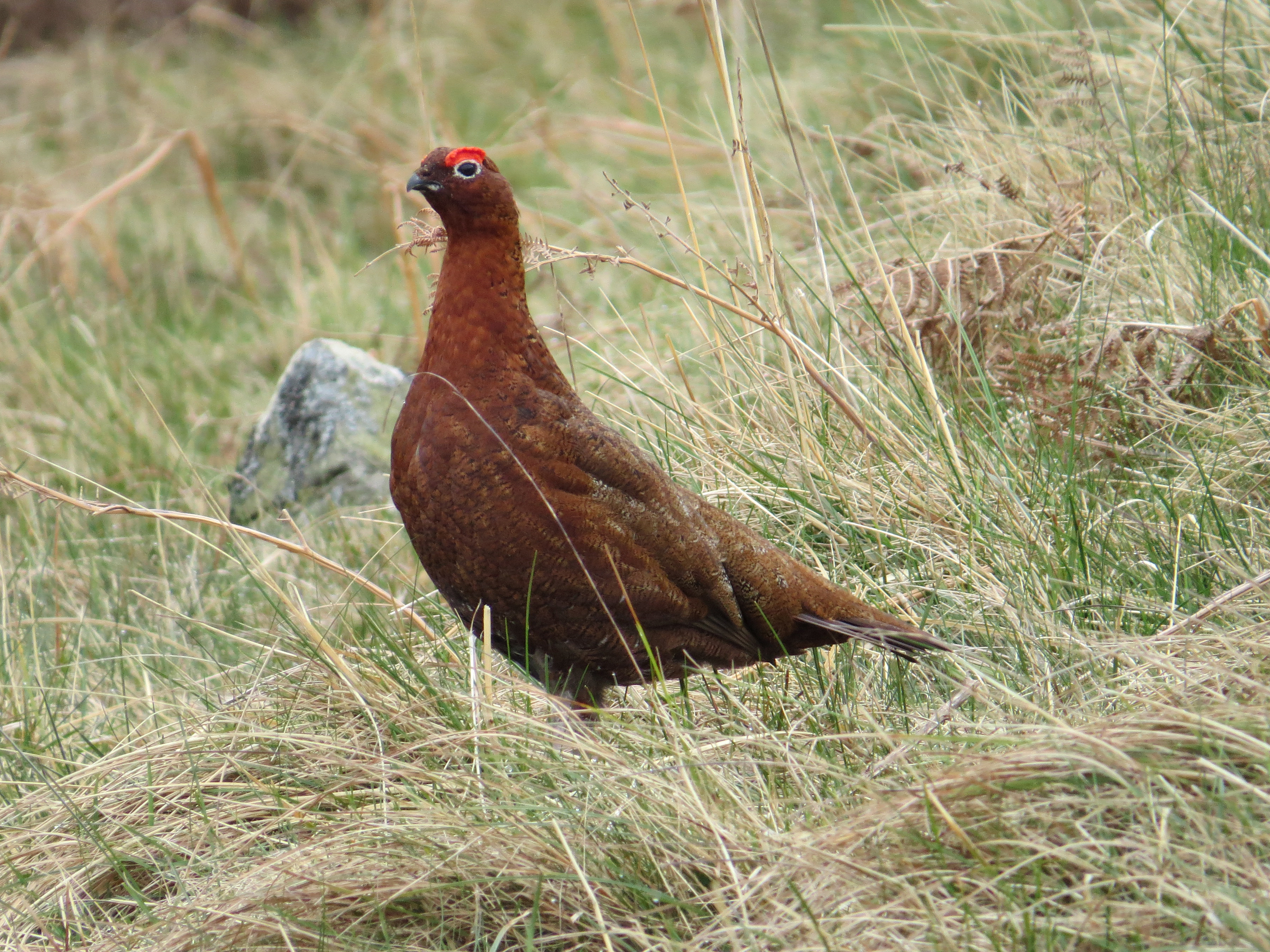
- Male red grouse in the Cheviot Hills in Northumberland

Scientific classification
- Kingdom: Animalia
- Phylum: Chordata
- Class: Aves
- Order: Galliformes
- Family: Phasianidae
- Genus: Lagopus
- Species: L. scotica

Binomial name
- Lagopus scotica (Latham, 1787)

Synonyms
- Lagopus lagopus scoticus

Audio
- Song and calls recorded in the UK

= Red grouse =

Species of bird

The red grouse (Lagopus scotica) is a medium-sized bird in the grouse tribe which is found in heather moorland in Great Britain and Ireland.

It was formerly classified as a subspecies of the willow grouse (Lagopus lagopus) but is now considered to be a separate species. It is also known as the moorcock, moorfowl or moorbird. Lagopus is derived from Ancient Greek lagos (λαγος), meaning "hare", + pous (πους), "foot", in reference to the feathered feet and toes typical of this cold-adapted genus, and scotica means "of Scotland".

The red grouse is the emblem of the journal British Birds. The red grouse is also the logo of The Famous Grouse whisky and an animated bird is a character in a series of its advertisements.

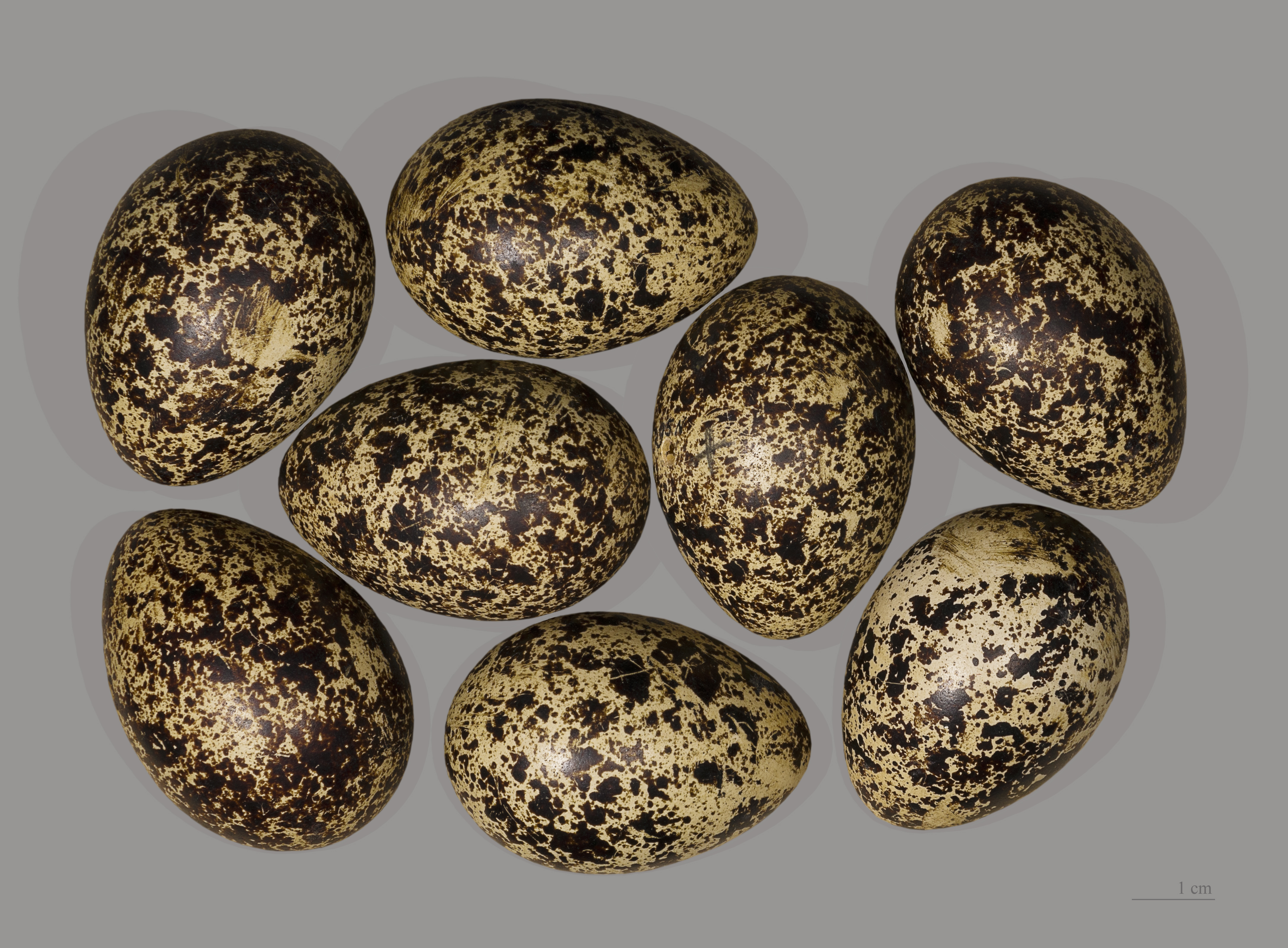
Red grouse eggs

== Description ==
The red grouse is distinguished from the willow grouse and rock ptarmigan by its reddish brown plumage being present all year, lacking any white winter plumage or white wing feathers. The tail is black and the legs are white. There are white stripes on the underwings and red crests above the eyes. Females are less reddish than the males and have less prominent crests. Juveniles are duller and lack the red crests.

Birds in Ireland are sometimes thought to be a separate subspecies L. s. hibernica, but this is not currently accepted as distinct. They are slightly paler than those in Britain and the females have yellower plumage with more finely barred underparts. This may be an adaptation to camouflage them in moorland with more grass and sedge growth and less heather.

It is audially identified by its 'chut!chut!chut!chut!chut!chuttt....' call, or the 'Goback, goback, goback' vocalisation. The wings make a whirring sound when the bird is disturbed from a resting place.

Grouse populations exhibit periodic cycles in which the population peaks to very high densities before crashing and recovering a few years later. The main causative agent of this cyclical pattern is thought to be the parasitic nematode worm Trichostrongylus tenuis. However, V. C. Wynne-Edwards suggests that the primary cause of mortality in grouse populations is homeostasis, which is largely dependent on food availability, and that the 'Grouse disease', due to the parasitic worm Trichostrongylus tenuis is a misdiagnosis of the after-effects of social exclusion.

== Distribution and habitat ==
The red grouse is endemic to Britain and Ireland. It evolved in isolation from other subspecies of the willow grouse which are widespread in northern parts of Eurasia and North America.

It is found across most parts of Scotland, including Orkney, Shetland and most of the Outer Hebrides; it is only absent from urban areas, such as in the Central Belt, and other coastal lowlands in the south and east.

There are sporadic populations in Wales, but their range has retracted. They are now largely absent from the far south, their main strongholds being Snowdonia, the Brecon Beacons and the Cambrian Mountains.

In England it is mainly found in the north, in Northumberland, County Durham, the Lake District, much of Yorkshire, the Pennines and the Peak District, as far south as the Staffordshire Moorlands; Welsh spillover birds also visit and breed in the Shropshire Hills such as Long Mynd.

In Ireland it can be found locally in most higher altitude parts of the country; it is most common in County Mayo, where the population is increasing, and on the County Antrim plateau, with other healthy populations in the Slieve Bloom Mountains and the Knockmealdown Mountains; There is still a small population in the Wicklow Mountains in southern County Dublin.

The small population in the Isle of Man is mostly concentrated in the southern hills but conservation work is ongoing throughout the uplands to ensure the species' continued viability.

Its typical habitat is upland heather moorland with the absence of trees. It can also be found in some low-lying bogs, and birds sometimes visit farmland during harsh winter weather, where they will sometimes eat hawthorn berries in hedgerows.

The British population is estimated at 250,000 pairs with around 1–5,000 pairs in Ireland. A decline in population numbers has been observed in recent years, with birds now absent from areas where they were previously common. The primary causes for the decline include the loss of heather due to overgrazing, establishment of new conifer plantations and a decline in the number of upland gamekeepers.

The species was introduced to Exmoor in the 1820s and Dartmoor in 1915–1916; the Exmoor population now appears to be extinct, with the last birds sighted as recently as 2009, but it is still present on Dartmoor. An introduced population in Suffolk died out in the early 20th century. Red grouse were also introduced to the Hautes Fagnes region of Belgium but the population there died out in the early 1970s.

== Behaviour ==
=== Diet ===
The adult red grouse is primarily herbivorous, feeding mainly on the shoots, seeds and flowers of heather. It will also eat berries, cereal crops and sometimes insects.

=== Breeding ===
Pair formation among birds begins in autumn, with males becoming increasingly territorial as winter progresses. The nest is a shallow scrape measuring up to 20 cm (7.9 in) wide which is lined with vegetation. About six to nine eggs are laid, mainly during April and May. They are oval, shiny and pale yellow with dark brown spots. The eggs incubate for 19 to 25 days, the chicks are able to fly within 12 to 13 days. They are fully grown after 30 to 35 days.

== Conservation ==
The Member States of the European Union are required by Council Directive 2009/147/EC on the conservation of wild birds (popularly called the Birds Directive) to take necessary measures to protect the red grouse; however, as it is a species listed in Annex II of the Directive, Article 7 allows for hunting under national law, provided that it does not threaten population levels. In 2002, Ireland was found by the European Court of Justice to be in breach of its obligations under an earlier Birds Directive to protect the red grouse by allowing an important breeding site to become degraded through overgrazing by sheep. Conservation measures taken as a result of the judgment have doubled the population in the area from c.400 to 800.

== As a game bird ==
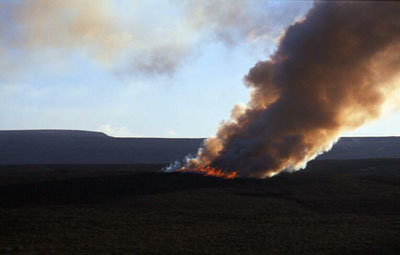
Controlled burning of heather, on a Derbyshire grouse moor

The red grouse is considered a game bird and is shot in large numbers during the shooting season, which traditionally begins on August 12, known as the Glorious Twelfth. There is vigorous competition between some London restaurants to serve freshly shot grouse on August 12, with birds flown from the moors and prepared within hours.

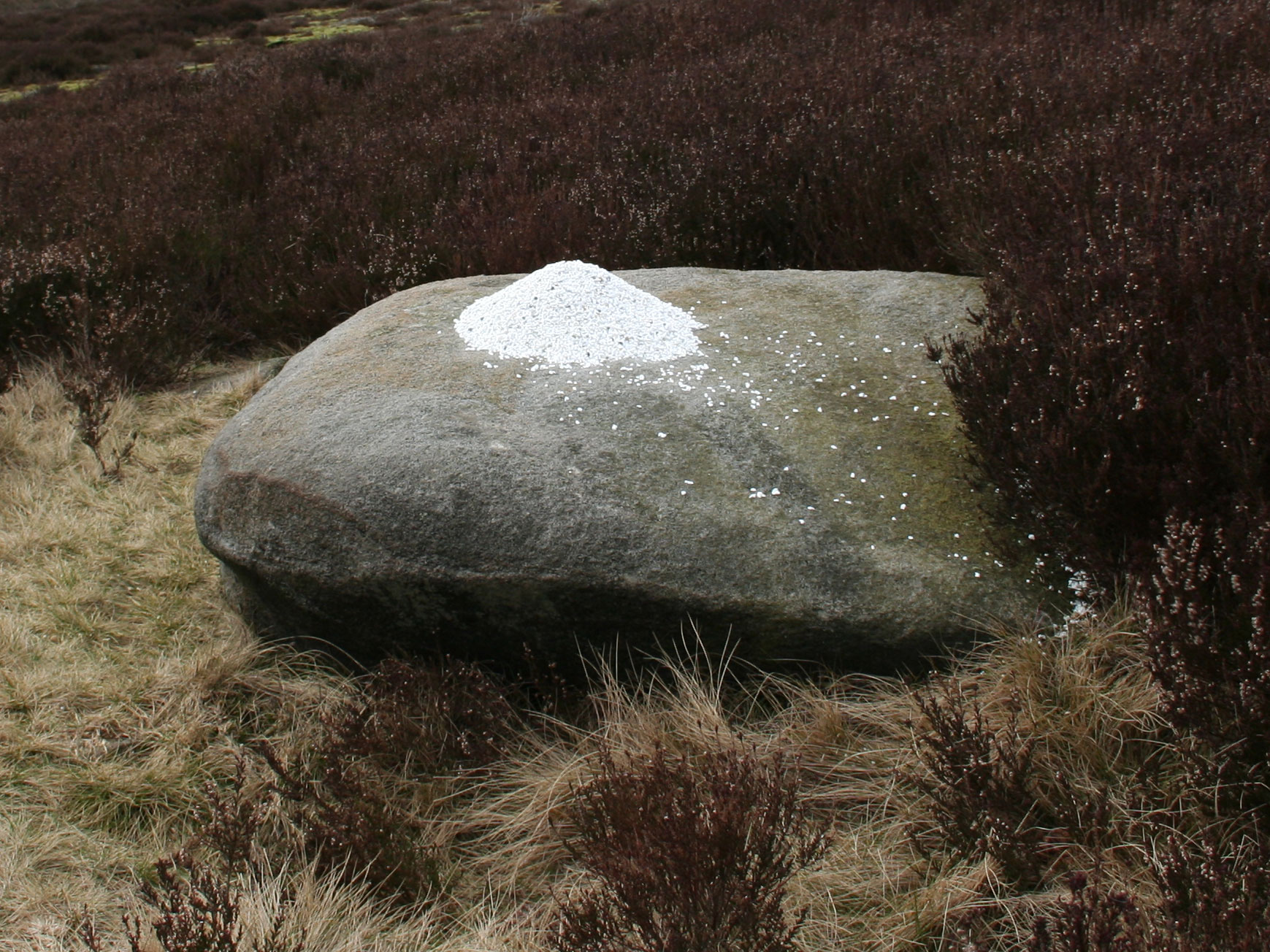
Grouse grit

Shooting can take the form of 'walked up' (where shooters walk across the moor to flush grouse and shoot) or 'driven' (where grouse are driven, often in large numbers, by 'beaters' towards the guns who are hiding behind a line of 'butts'). Many moors are managed to increase densities of grouse. Areas of heather are subjected to controlled burning to allow the regeneration of fresh young shoots, which are considered a preferred food source for grouse. Extensive predator control is another feature of grouse moor management: foxes, stoats and crows are usually heavily controlled on grouse moors. The extent to which this is done on grouse moors is a subject of considerable debate between conservation groups and shooting interests, and attracts much media attention in relation to grouse moors and shooting.

In recent decades the practice of using medicated grit and direct dosing of birds against an endoparasite, the strongyle worm or threadworm (Trichostrongylus tenuis), has become part of the management regime on many moors.

== As food ==
As with most other game birds, the flavour of grouse meat is enhanced if the bird is hung for several days after being shot and before being eaten. Roasting is the most common method of cooking a grouse.

The Cookery Book of Lady Clark of Tillypronie (1909) has 11 recipes for using grouse. The recipe "To cook old birds" is as follows:

Old grouse are not fit for cooking till the feathers pull very loosely from the "apron". When "high", put a piece of bread inside them while roasting; take out the bread before dishing, and throw it away. A good gravy should be served with them in a boat, none in the dish, but put the birds on a toast when bread is plentiful.

— Lady Clark of Tillypronie

== Scientific study ==
Red grouse have been the subject of extensive scientific study due to their economic and social importance as well as their unusual lifecycle and biological traits. They were the subject of some of the earliest studies of population biology in birds, as detailed in The Grouse in Health and in Disease by Lord Lovat in 1911. Since the mid-20th century they have been the focus of ongoing research by numerous organisations and individuals. Significant contributions have been made by the Institute of Terrestrial Ecology in the eastern Cairngorms, and by the Game & Wildlife Conservation Trust in the Central Highlands. Contemporary research continues to explore diverse aspects of grouse biology, with a substantial corpus of published literature available.

== Parasites and viruses ==
The red grouse is susceptible to infestation by parasites and viruses that can have a severe impact on population levels. Strongylosis or 'grouse disease' is caused by the strongyle worm, which causes damage and internal bleeding after burrowing into the caecum. This endoparasite is often ingested with the tops of young heather shoots and can lead to mortality and poor health, including a decrease in the bird's ability to control the scent it emits.

First diagnosed in the UK in 2010, respiratory cryptosporidiosis, caused by Cryptosporidium baileyi, is present on about half of the grouse moors in northern England, where it reduces natural survival and productivity of red grouse.

Louping ill virus is a flavivirus (RNA virus), also known as sheep encephalomyelitis virus. Flaviviruses are transmitted by arthropods, and louping ill virus is transmitted by ticks. In red grouse, this virus can cause mortality as high as 78%. The main tick vector is the sheep tick Ixodes ricinus. Although tick-borne diseases are conventionally thought to be caused when the parasite bites its host, it has been shown that red grouse chicks can be affected when they ingest ticks with which they come into contact. This virus may be a significant factor in red grouse populations.
