= Gamekeepers in the United Kingdom =

Person who manages an area of countryside and ensures there is game or fish

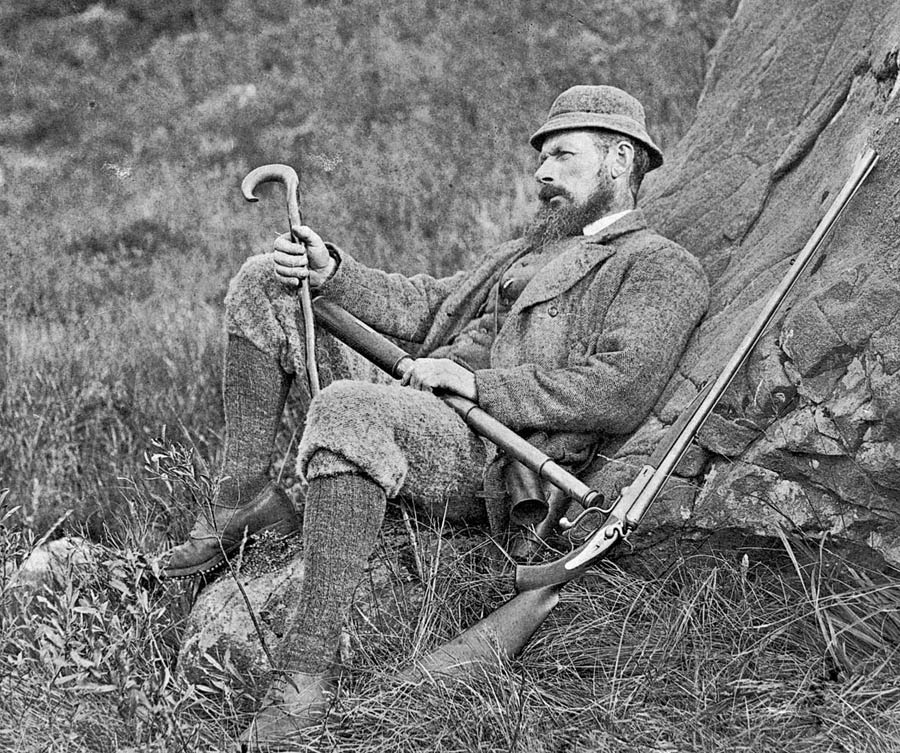
Gamekeeper in the late 19th century

In the United Kingdom, a gamekeeper (often abbreviated to keeper) is a person who manages an area of countryside (e.g., areas of woodland, moorland, waterway, or farmland) to make sure that there is enough game for hunting, or fish for fishing, and acts as guide to those pursuing them.

== Description ==
Typically, a gamekeeper is employed by a landowner or by a country estate, to prevent poaching, to rear and release game birds such as common pheasants and French partridge, eradicate pests, encourage and manage wild red grouse, and to control predators such as weasels, to manage habitats to suit game, and to monitor the health of the game. Today, some three thousand full-time gamekeepers are employed in the UK, compared to as many as 25,000 at the beginning of the 20th century. In addition, there are many people who spend their leisure time and money rearing game and maintaining habitats on their own small shoots.

There are several variations in gamekeeping:

- Stalkers: keepers who specialise in the stealthy pursuit of deer, mainly in the uplands of Scotland.
- Lowland keepers: rearing pheasant and partridge and managing lowland habitats.

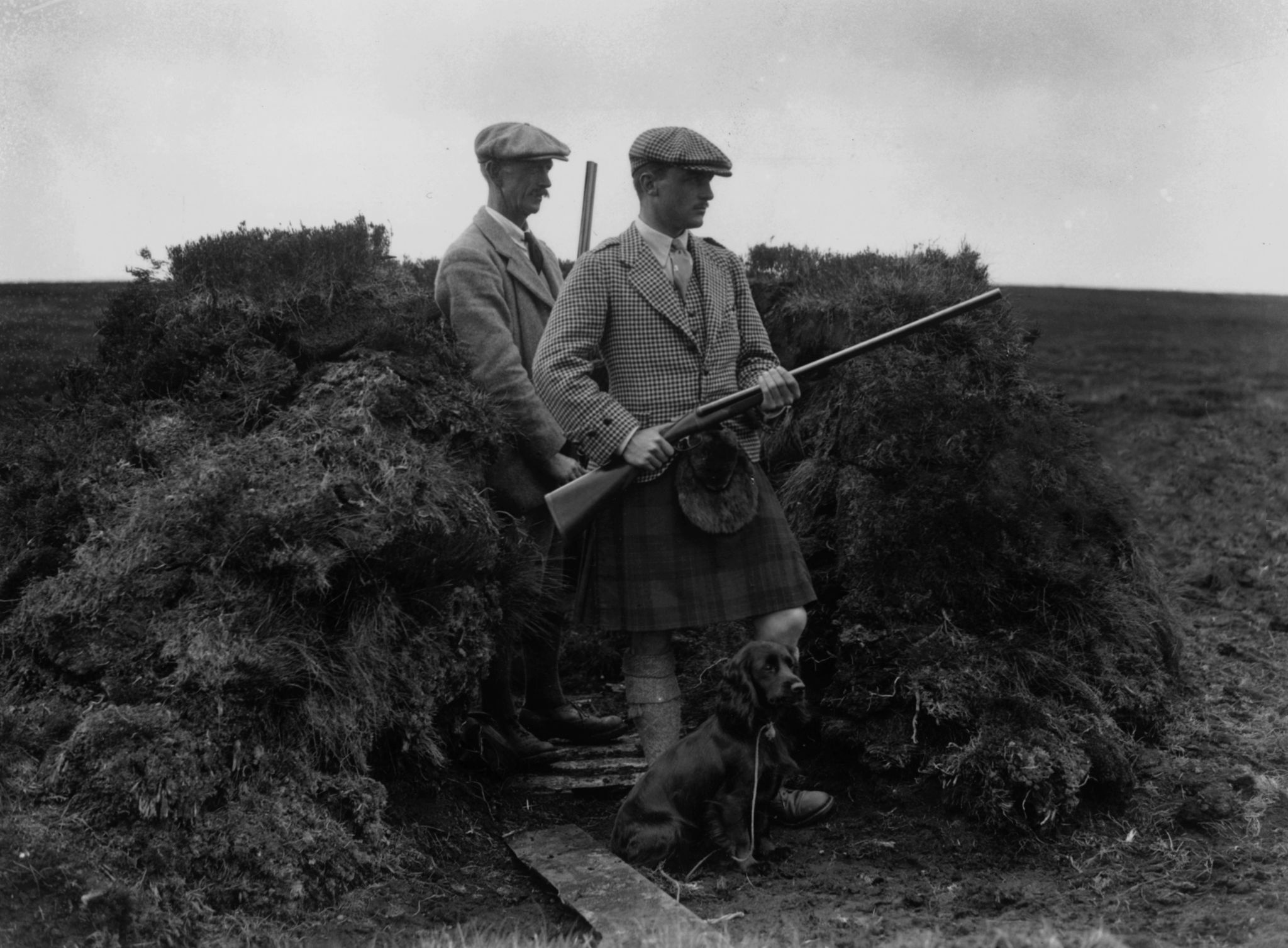
Gamekeeper (left) with a shooter on a driven grouse shoot in the Highlands, ca. 1922

- Upland keepers: managing moorland for grouse in upland areas.
- Gillie/river keepers: keepers who manage rivers such as the River Spey for trout and salmon.

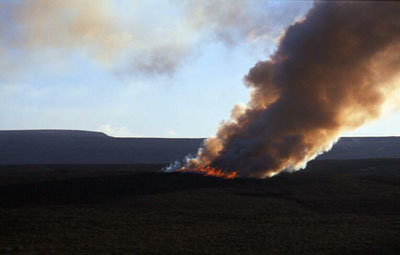
Controlled burning of heather, one of the countryside management duties of gamekeepers

The most senior individual dealing with wildlife on a particular estate is often called the head keeper or head stalker.

Gamekeepers and country sports enthusiasts hold that gamekeeping is an essential part of countryside conservation. Two-thirds of the UK rural landmass is managed for shooting. The shooting industry creates £1.6 billion. £250 million is spent on conservation as a result of shooting.

== Training ==
Some colleges in the UK now offer courses in gamekeeping up to and including diploma level. Two of these include the Northern School of Game and Wildlife at Newton Rigg College, Cumbria and Myerscough College, Lancashire.

The Elmwood Campus of Scotland's Rural College (SRUC) in Cupar, Fife is Scotland's main gamekeeping college. The main campus for attaining both NC and HNC levels in gamekeepeing for south Scotland is borders college. Easton and Otley college: Easton Campus also provides a course on gamekeeping level 2 and 3.

== Scottish Gamekeepers Association ==
In 1997, as a result of months of adverse media criticism of gamekeepers, the Scottish Gamekeepers Association (SGA) was formed with a goal of promoting the work of gamekeepers and developing training in the area of law and best practices in the field of game management. The SGA chairman is Alex Hogg, a gamekeeper from Scotland.

== The National Gamekeepers' Organisation ==
In 1997 the National Gamekeepers' Organisation (NGO) was set up for the same reasons and in addition they felt that the main shooting association was not representing the keepers properly. The NGO now has some 15,000 members. The NGO run industry-based training for keepers and were the first organisation to react to EU legislation with regard to game meat hygiene, producing a course for experienced keepers and stalkers which had approval from the Food Standards Agency. The NGO continue to promote gamekeeping, stalking, shooting, and fishing. Its chairman is Lindsay Waddell, a gamekeeper from Co. Durham. The NGO also have dedicated moorland and deer branches.

== Criticism ==
The League Against Cruel Sports estimates some 12,300 wild mammals and birds are killed on UK shooting estates every day and sees gamekeepers as playing a key role in the destruction of wildlife. On the other hand, the shooting industry says that gamekeepers are vital wildlife conservation workers in the countryside. The National Gamekeeper's Organisation (NGO) claims that nine times as much of the British countryside is looked after by gamekeepers as is in nature reserves and National Parks.

The Royal Society for the Protection of Birds has criticised the persecution of birds of prey on some shooting estates. 68% of those convicted of raptor persecution are gamekeepers. "We’ve seen evidence linking gamekeepers to bird of prey persecution, and moorlands empty of raptors imply that much more illegal killing goes on undetected".

== In fiction ==
- Alec Scudder in Maurice by E. M. Forster
- Mellors in Lady Chatterley's Lover by D. H. Lawrence
- Rubeus Hagrid in the Harry Potter series
- Tom Redruth in Treasure Island by Robert Louis Stevenson
- Phillip White in Lark Rise to Candleford
- Several characters past and present in the BBC Radio 4 soap opera The Archers e.g. Andrew Gach
- Joseph in Hautot and His Son by Guy de Maupassant
- William Crowder in The Boscombe Valley Mystery by Sir Arthur Conan Doyle
- The Gamekeeper by Barry Hines
- Kincade in Skyfall
- Golly Mackenzie in Monarch of the Glen
- The Gamekeeper at Home by Richard Jefferies – 1878
- Robert Muldoon in Jurassic Park
- Jocelyn Greedon in Doctors
- Nield in Downton Abbey
- Geoff Seacombe in The Gentlemen

== See also ==
- Professional hunter
- Hunting
- Game preservation
- Gamekeeper's thumb
