= Goodall =

Goodall may refer to:

== Surname ==
- Abraham Harrison Goodall (1847–1912), English architect
- Alan Goodall (born 1981), English football full back
- Alice Goodall (born 2001), British athlete
- Angela Goodall (born 1961), British archer
- Archie Goodall (1864–1929), Irish footballer
- Bella Goodall (1851–1884), English actress
- Bud Goodall (1952–2012), American academic
- Caroline Goodall (born 1959), English actress
- Charles Goodall (physician) (1642–1712), English physician
- Charles Goodall (poet) (1671–1689), English poet
- Charles Goodall (cricketer) (1782–1872), English cricketer
- Charles Goodall (businessman) (1824–1899), American businessman and politician
- Charles Miner Goodall (1859–1922), American businessman and steamship captain
- Charlotte Goodall (1766–1830), British actress
- Chris Goodall (born 1955), English businessman and author
- David Goodall (botanist) (1914–2018), Australian botanist and ecologist
- David Goodall (diplomat) (1931–2016), British diplomat
- David Goodall (director) (1964–2023), Scottish film director, producer and actor
- David Goodall (chemist) (1941–2025), British chemist
- Edward Goodall (1795–1870), English engraver
- Edward Angelo Goodall (1819–1908), English artist, son of Edward Goodall (1795–1870)
- Edwin Goodall (1863–1944), British physician
- Edyth Goodall (1886–1929), Scottish actress
- Ellison Goodall (born 1954), American long-distance runner
- Fabian Goodall (born 1994), Fijian rugby player
- Frances Goodall (1893–1976), British nurse
- Francis Henry Goodall (1838–1925), American Civil War soldier
- Frederick Goodall (1822–1904), English artist, son of Edward Goodall (1795–1870)
- Frederick Trevelyan Goodall (1848–1871), British painter
- Fred Goodall (1938–2021), New Zealand cricket umpire
- George Goodall (1891–1963), Australian rules footballer
- Gladys Goodall (1908–2015), New Zealand photographer
- Glen Goodall (born 1970), Canadian ice hockey player
- Graeme Goodall (1932–2014), Australian recording engineer and record label owner
- Harry Goodall (1877–1961), English cricketer
- Heather Goodall (1950–2026), Australian academic and historian
- Herb Goodall (1870–1938), American professional baseball player
- Howard Goodall (born 1958), British composer
- Howard Goodall (painter) (1850–1874), British painter
- Hurley Goodall (1927–2021), American politician
- James Goodall (1862–1942), New Zealand politician
- Jane Goodall (1934–2025), British ethologist and primatologist
- Jane R. Goodall (born 1951), Australian novelist
- Jason Goodall (born 1967), English tennis player, coach, and broadcaster
- John Goodall (1863–1942), British footballer
- John Goodall (author) (born 1970), British architectural historian and author
- John Goodall (MP) (died 1725), English politician
- John Edwin Goodall (1893–1960), Australian ice hockey player
- John Strickland Goodall (1908–1996), British artist and illustrator
- Jonathan Goodall (born 1961), former English Anglican bishop
- Joseph Goodall (1760–1840), English cleric
- Joseph Goodall (boxer) (born 1992), Australian boxer
- Joshua Goodall (born 1985), British tennis player
- Ken Goodall (1947–2006), Irish rugby union footballer
- Lara Goodall (born 1996), South African cricketer
- Lewis Goodall (born 1989), British journalist (BBC Newsnight, Sky News)
- Louis B. Goodall (1851–1935), American politician
- Marion C. Goodall (1875–1958), American philanthropist
- Maurice Goodall (1928–2010), New Zealand bishop
- Oliver Goodall (1922–2010), one of the Tuskegee Airmen
- Peter Goodall (born 1949), Australian academic and author
- R. Natalie P. Goodall (1935–2015), American-Argentinian natural historian
- Reginald Goodall (1901–1990), English conductor
- Reuben Goodall (born 2003), Australian racing driver
- Richard Goodall, American singer and janitor
- Sir Roderick Goodall (1947–1921), British air marshal
- Roy Goodall (1902–1982), British professional footballer
- Samuel Goodall (died 1801), British naval officer
- Scott Goodall (1935–2016), British comics writer
- Seth Goodall, American politician
- Sir Stanley Vernon Goodall (1883–1965), British naval architect
- Steve Goodall (born 1957), Australian racing cyclist
- Strickland Goodall (1874–1934), British physician, clinical cardiologist, and physiologist
- Thomas Goodall (1767–1832), British merchant captain
- W. Edward Goodall, American politician
- W. A. B. Goodall (1880–1941), British soldier and engineer
- Walter Goodall (c. 1706–1766), Scottish historical writer
- Walter Goodall (painter) (1830–1889), English painter

== Given name ==
- Goodall Gondwe (1936–2023), Malawian economist

== Other uses ==
- 16857 Goodall, a minor planet
- Goodall Building, a historic commercial building in Cincinnati, Ohio, U.S.
- Goodall Cup, awarded to the playoff champions of the Australian Ice Hockey League
- Goodall focus, a Hopewellian people from Indiana and Michigan, U.S.
- Goodall Park, a baseball venue in Sanford, Maine, U.S.
- Goodall Ridge, Prince Charles Mountains, Antarctica
- HMS Goodall, a British frigate commissioned into the Royal Navy in 1943 and sunk in 1945
- Mount Goodall, a mountain in British Columbia, Canada

== See also ==
- Goodale (disambiguation)
- Goodell (disambiguation)
- Goodall House (disambiguation)
