= Goodall House =

Goodall House may refer to:

- Goodall House (Macon, Georgia), listed on the NRHP in Georgia
- Seaborn Goodall House, Sylvania, Georgia, listed on the NRHP in Screven County, Georgia
- Thomas Goodall House, Sanford, Maine, listed on the NRHP in York County, Maine

== See also ==
- Goodall-Woods Law Office, Bath, New Hampshire, listed on the NRHP in Grafton County, New Hampshire
- Goodall Building, Cincinnati, Ohio, NRHP-listed
