= Goodale =

Goodale may refer to:

== People ==
- Anna Goodale (born 1983), American rower
- Christine Goodale, American ecosystem ecologist
- Dora Goodale (1866–1953), American poet
- Elaine Goodale (1863–1953), American poet
- George Lincoln Goodale (1839–1923), American botanist
- Hubert Dana Goodale (1879–1968), American livestock breeder and geneticist
- James Goodale (born 1933), former General Counsel and Vice Chairman of The New York Times
- Lincoln Goodale (1782–1868), first doctor to live in Columbus, Ohio, United States
- Melvyn A. Goodale (born 1943), Canadian neuroscientist
- Ralph Goodale (born 1949), Canada's Minister of Public Safety
- Robert L. Goodale (1930–2014), American surgeon and philanthropist

== Places ==
- Goodale Creek, a stream in Inyo County, California, U.S.; see Taboose Fire
- Goodale Mountain, a summit in Inyo County, California
- Goodale Park, Columbus, Ohio, U.S.
- Goodale State Park, Camden, South Carolina, U.S.
- Mount Goodale, in the Queen Maud Mountains, Antarctica
  - Goodale Glacier, a glacier which flows north from the mountain

== See also ==
- Goodall (disambiguation)
