= Jeremiah Hutchins Tavern =

Historic tavern in New Hampshire, United States

- U.S. National Register of Historic Places
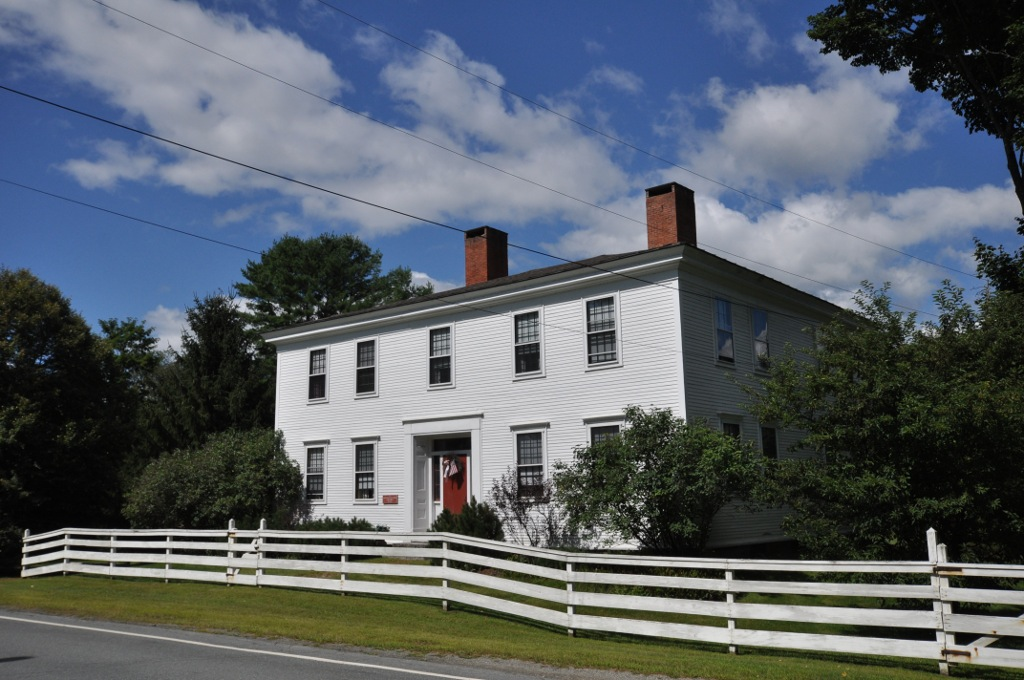

- Location within New Hampshire Location within the United States
- Location: US 302, Upper Village, Bath, New Hampshire
- Coordinates: 44°10′41″N 71°56′40″W
- Area: 1 acre (0.40 ha)
- Built: 1794
- Architectural style: Georgian, Federal
- NRHP reference No.: 84003194
- Added to NRHP: September 7, 1984

The Jeremiah Hutchins Tavern is a historic former tavern on United States Route 302 in northwestern Bath, New Hampshire. Built by 1799 by one of the town's early settlers, the building (now a private residence) is one of the town's finest surviving examples of transitional Georgian-Federal architecture. The building was listed on the National Register of Historic Places in 1984.

== Description and history ==
The Jeremiah Hutchins Tavern stands near the northern end of Bath's Upper Village, a cluster of residential and agricultural buildings about 1.5 miles (2.4 km) north of the village center. It is located close to the west side of United States Route 302, opposite Hutchins Lane. It is a two-story wood-frame structure, with a hip roof, two interior chimneys, and a clapboarded exterior. A two-story gabled ell extends to the rear, flush with the main block's southern facade. The main facade, facing the street, is five bays wide, with windows arranged symmetrically around the center entrance. The entrance is set in a recess with paneled sides, and sidelight and transom windows. It originally had an entrance on the north side, but it has been closed up and a bathroom placed in its stead. Much of the original interior finish work has been preserved.

The building, now a private residence, was built sometime between 1794, when Jeremiah Hutchins was granted a license by the town to operate a tavern, and 1799, when it was reported to open. It is the best-preserved transitional Georgian-Federal building in the town. Hutchins was one of Bath's early settlers, and he and his descendants were leading citizens of the town. The Hutchinses were responsible for building most of the historic buildings in the upper village, and William, a grandson of Jeremiah, is credited with construction of the Brick Store in Bath village.

== See also ==
- National Register of Historic Places listings in Grafton County, New Hampshire
