= Goodell =

Goodell may refer to:

== People ==
- Charles Goodell (1926–1987), American politician
- Charles Goodell (born 1853) (1853–1940), American farmer and politician from New York
- David H. Goodell (1834–1915), American manufacturer and politician from New Hampshire
- Fred Goodell (1876–1961), American politician from Arizona
- Grace Goodell, academic
- Jeff Goodell (fl. 1990s–present), American journalist and author
- Lemuel Goodell (1800–1897), American politician from Wisconsin
- Roger Goodell (born 1959), American football commissioner
- William Goodell (disambiguation)

== Other uses ==
- Goodell, Iowa, United States
- Goodell Creek, a tributary of the Skagit River in Washington, U.S.
- Goodell Glacier, Antarctica
- Goodell Hall, an academic building and former library of the University of Massachusetts Amherst

== See also ==
- Goodall (disambiguation)
- Goodell-Pratt (1888–1931), an American tool manufacturing company
