= Tiny White =

Tiny White may refer to:

- Richard White (rugby union) (1925–2012), New Zealand rugby union player and local politician, mayor of Gisborne (1977–1983)
- Tiny White (equestrian) (1924–2020), New Zealand equestrian
