= Restieaux =

Restieaux is a surname. Notable people with the surname include:

- Alfred Restieaux (1832–1911), British trader in the central Pacific
- Charles Restieaux (1865–1918), New Zealand cricketer
- Cyril Restieaux (1910–1996), British clergyman
- Norma Restieaux (born 1934), New Zealand cardiologist
