= Frederick William Price =

British physician (1873–1957)

Frederick William Price FRSE (13 March 1873 – 19 March 1957) was a 20th-century British cardiologist and medical author.

== Life ==
He was born on 13 March 1873 in Weston Rhyn in Shropshire, the son of William Price, a master tailor, and his wife Catherine Tunnah. He was educated at Ruabon Grammar School then studied the medicine at the University of Edinburgh. After serving as Resident Physician at Edinburgh Royal Infirmary he moved to London to serve as Assistant Resident Physician at the Brompton Hospital.

In 1914 he joined Dr Strickland Goodall as Physician at the newly built National Heart Hospital on Westmoreland Street.

He was elected a Fellow of the Royal Society of Edinburgh in 1915. His proposers were Sir William Turner, Sir Thomas Richard Fraser, Sir James Ormiston Affleck, Sir John Halliday Croom, Orlando Charnock Bradley and Charles Robertson Marshall.

In 1941 his Harley Street home was destroyed in the Blitz.

He retired in 1950 in poor health. He died at his home in London on 19 March 1957 aged 84.

== Publications ==
- Diseases of the Heart (1918)
- A Textbook of the Practice of Medicine (1922) eight editions up to 1950

== Family ==
Although a shy individual and poor mixer, aged 70 he married Hilda Gertrude Brown of Bath in 1943.
