= Chris Doig (opera singer) =

New Zealand opera singer and sports executive

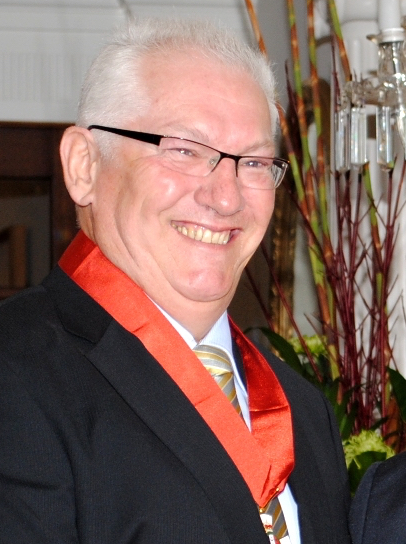
Doig in August 2011

Christopher Keith Doig CNZM OBE (4 April 1948 – 13 October 2011) was a New Zealand opera singer and sports administrator. In 1972 he won New Zealand's Mobil Song Quest and studied at the Vienna Music Academy before becoming principal tenor at the Vienna State Opera. After ten years in Austria, Doig returned to New Zealand, where he was appointed chief executive of New Zealand Cricket and was a member of the New Zealand Rugby Union board.

In 1990, Doig was the artistic director of the New Zealand Festival of the Arts. He staged Wagner's Die Meistersinger von Nürnberg, starring Donald McIntyre.

== Awards ==
In 1990, Doig was awarded the New Zealand 1990 Commemoration Medal. He was appointed an Officer of the Order of the British Empire, for services to the arts, in the 1992 Queen's Birthday Honours, and in the 2011 Queen's Birthday Honours he was made a Companion of the New Zealand Order of Merit, for services to the arts and sport.

== Family ==
Christopher Doig had four children: Rachel, Paul, and Brendon with his first wife Jane Doig and one child Luke with his second wife Suzanne Prain. At the time of his death he had 10 grandchildren. He also had three brothers an older brother John Doig and two younger brothers Quentin and Hamish Doig. His parents names were Roger and Ngarie.

Doig died on 13 October 2011 after a two-year battle with bowel cancer, aged 63.
