= Kevin Ireland =

New Zealand poet (1933–2023)

Kevin Ireland OBE
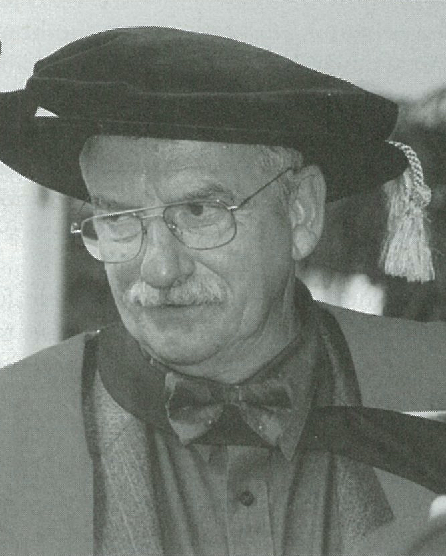
- Ireland in 2000
- Born: Kevin Mark Jowsey; 18 July 1933 Auckland, New Zealand
- Died: 19 May 2023 (aged 89) Auckland, New Zealand
- Occupation: Writer
- Genre: Poetry
- Spouse: Janet Wilson

Kevin Mark Ireland OBE (né Jowsey; 18 July 1933 – 19 May 2023) was a New Zealand poet, short story writer, novelist and librettist.

== Early life and career ==
Ireland was born Kevin Mark Jowsey in Auckland on 18 July 1933. As an infant he travelled to London with his parents where they lived for a time before returning to New Zealand. Shortly thereafter, his parents' marriage failed and he grew up on his maternal grandfather's Waikato farm, and then in Takapuna where he lived with his father. After leaving school, he studied at Auckland Teachers' College but did not complete a qualification.

After changing his surname by deed poll to Ireland in 1957, he headed to London in 1959 where he remained for twenty-five years (with the interlude of a short interval in Bulgaria, translating Bulgarian poetry into English); for two decades, Ireland was employed by The Times.

In 1986, Ireland was writer-in-residence at the University of Canterbury; in 1987, he was awarded the Sargeson Fellowship; in 1989, he was the University of Auckland's writing fellow, assistant editor of Quote Unquote, and president of PEN, 1990–91.

== Personal life and death ==
Ireland's first wife was Bulgarian film critic Donna Marinova whom he met and wed in Sofia in 1959 . After he spent 20 months in Bulgaria, the Communist authorities allowed Donna to leave the country and the young family moved to London. Ten years later they divorced. Ireland's second wife was Phoebe Caroline Dalwood (1940–2007); Ireland had two sons and lived in Devonport, New Zealand. He remarried in 2012 to Professor Janet Mary Wilson. Ireland died after a battle with cancer in Auckland, on 19 May 2023, at the age of 89.

== Honours and awards ==
- 1979 – New Zealand Book Award for Poetry for Literary Cartoons
- 1990 – New Zealand 1990 Commemoration Medal
- 1992 – Appointed an Officer of the Order of the British Empire, for services to literature, in the 1992 Queen's Birthday Honours
- 2000 – Conferred with an honorary Doctor of Literature degree by Massey University
- 2004 – Prime Minister's Awards for Literary Achievement

== Works ==
- Face to Face: Twenty-Four Poems. Pegasus Press. 1963. ISBN 978-1-877577-69-7.
- Educating the Body. Cayton Press. 1967.
- A Letter from Amsterdam. 1972.
- Orchids, Hummingbirds and Other Poems. Auckland University Press. 1974. ISBN 9780196479132.
- A Grammar of Dreams. Wai-te-ata Press. 1975. ISBN 9780465026951.
- Literary Cartoons. 1977.
- The Dangers of Art. 1980. ISBN 9780908599066.
- Practice Night in the Drill Hall: Poems. OUP Australia and New Zealand. 1984. ISBN 9780195581164.
- The Year of the Comet. Islands. 1986. ISBN 0473003775.
- Selected Poems. OUP Australia and New Zealand. 1988. ISBN 978-0195581683.
- Tiberius at the Beehive. Auckland University Press. 1990. ISBN 9781869400439.
- Skinning a fish. Hazard Press. 1994. ISBN 978-0908790777.
- Anzac Day: Selected Poems. Hazard Press. 1997. ISBN 978-1-877161-11-7.
- Fourteen reasons for writing: new poems. Hazard Press. 2001. ISBN 978-1-877270-08-6.
- Walking the land. Hazard Press. 2003. ISBN 978-1-877270-52-9.
- Airports and other wasted days. Hazard Press. 2007. ISBN 9781877393341.
- How to Survive the Morning. Cape Catley. 2008. ISBN 9781877340178.
- Table Talk. 2009.
- Dreamy Days and Nothing Done. Steele Roberts Aotearoa. 2012. ISBN 978-1-877577-69-7.
- Selected Poems 1963-2013. Steele Roberts Aotearoa. 2013. ISBN 978-1-927242-16-2.
- Feeding the birds. Steele Roberts Aotearoa. 2014. ISBN 978-1-927242-81-0.
- Looking out to sea. Steele Roberts Aotearoa. 2015. ISBN 978-1-927242-92-6.
- Humphry Bogart's great sacrifice. Steele Roberts Aotearoa. 2016. ISBN 978-0-947493-36-3.
- A fine morning at Passchendaele. Steele Roberts Aotearoa. 2018. ISBN 978-0-947493-67-7.
- Keeping a grip. Steele Roberts Aotearoa. 2018. ISBN 978-0-94749380-6.
- Shape of the heart. Quentin Wilson Publishing. 2020. ISBN 978-0-9951329-6-2.
- Just like that. Quentin Wilson Publishing. 2022. ISBN 978-0-9951437-3-9.

=== Short stories ===
- Sleeping With the Angels. Penguin Books. 1995. ISBN 978-0-14-024497-7.

=== Novels ===
- Blowing My Top. Penguin Books. 1996. ISBN 978-0-14-025645-1.
- The Man Who Never Lived. Vintage. 1997. ISBN 9781869413255.
- The Craymore Affair. Vintage. 2000. ISBN 1869414268.
- Getting Away With It. Hazard. 2004. ISBN 9781877270796.
- The Jigsaw Chronicles. Cape Catley. 2008. ISBN 9781877340154.
- Daisy Chains. David Ling. 2010. ISBN 9781877378393.

=== Editor ===
- The New Zealand Collection: A Celebration of the New Zealand Novel. Random House. 1990. ISBN 9781869540074.

=== Memoirs ===
- Under the bridge and over the moon. Vintage. 1998. ISBN 978-1-86941-363-7.
- Backwards to forwards: a memoir. Vintage. 2002. ISBN 978-1-86941-499-3. Translated into Bulgarian and published in 2024 by Europe and the World Foundation in Sofia, Bulgaria https://evropaworld.eu/memoarite-na-kevin-ajarland-veche-sa-dostapni-za-balgarskite-chitateli/
- A Month at the Back of My Brain: A Third Memoir. Quentin Wilson. 2022. ISBN 978-1-99-110306-2.
