= Brick Store (Bath, New Hampshire) =

- U.S. National Register of Historic Places
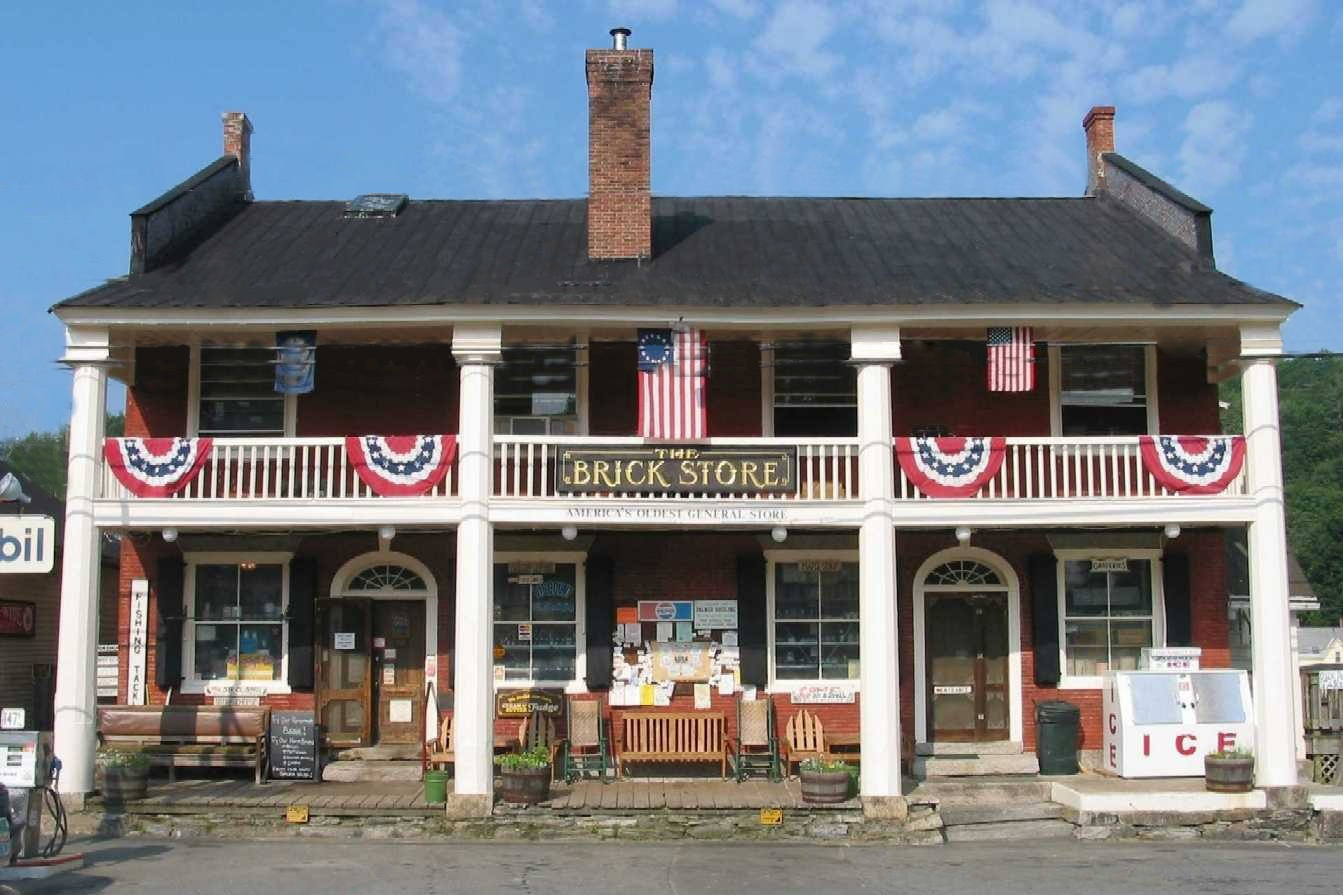

- Location within New Hampshire Location within the United States
- Location: 21 Lisbon Road, Bath, New Hampshire
- Coordinates: 44°10′1.2″N 71°57′57.8″W
- Area: less than one acre
- Built: ca. 1790
- Architectural style: Federal
- NRHP reference No.: 85002780
- Added to NRHP: November 07, 1985

The Brick Store, at 21 Lisbon Road in Bath, New Hampshire, claims to be the oldest continuously operating general store in the United States.

== History ==
The initial construction date of this brick two-story structure is uncertain, and was claimed to be 1804 by a 1937 reference work. Its predominantly Federal styling supports a date in this timeframe. It is known through other documentation to have been standing in 1814, and was damaged by fire in 1824. Repairs at that time probably included adding Greek Revival elements to the building's exterior. Although numerous Federal-style brick buildings were built in Bath, this is the only commercial one to survive.

The building was added to the National Register of Historic Places in 1985.

Located on the Ammonoosuc River, the store is one of the most well-known landmarks of northern New Hampshire. Not only does it sell groceries, gas, and beer, at one time it was a place where customers could drop off UPS packages and dry-cleaning, and pick up mail. It is famous for its buttermilk donuts, smoked meats, fudge, and fudge-covered meats. The store is especially well known for its smoked cheese and smoked pepperoni. The store is a regular stop on the presidential campaign trail; candidate Barack Obama visited the store on May 28, 2007, with his daughters.

Due to a combination of a poor economy generally, and the loss of local customers to major chain stores, the store suffered financially in the early 2000s. The closing of the Bath Covered Bridge for 20 months in 2012-2014 further hurt business. The store was sold at auction in July 2016 for $235,000. The new owners renovated the store with an eye to historic appropriateness, and it was re-opened in July 2017.

== See also ==
- National Register of Historic Places listings in Grafton County, New Hampshire
