= Francis Henry Goodall =

American Civil War Medal of Honor recipient (1838–1925)

Francis H. Goodall
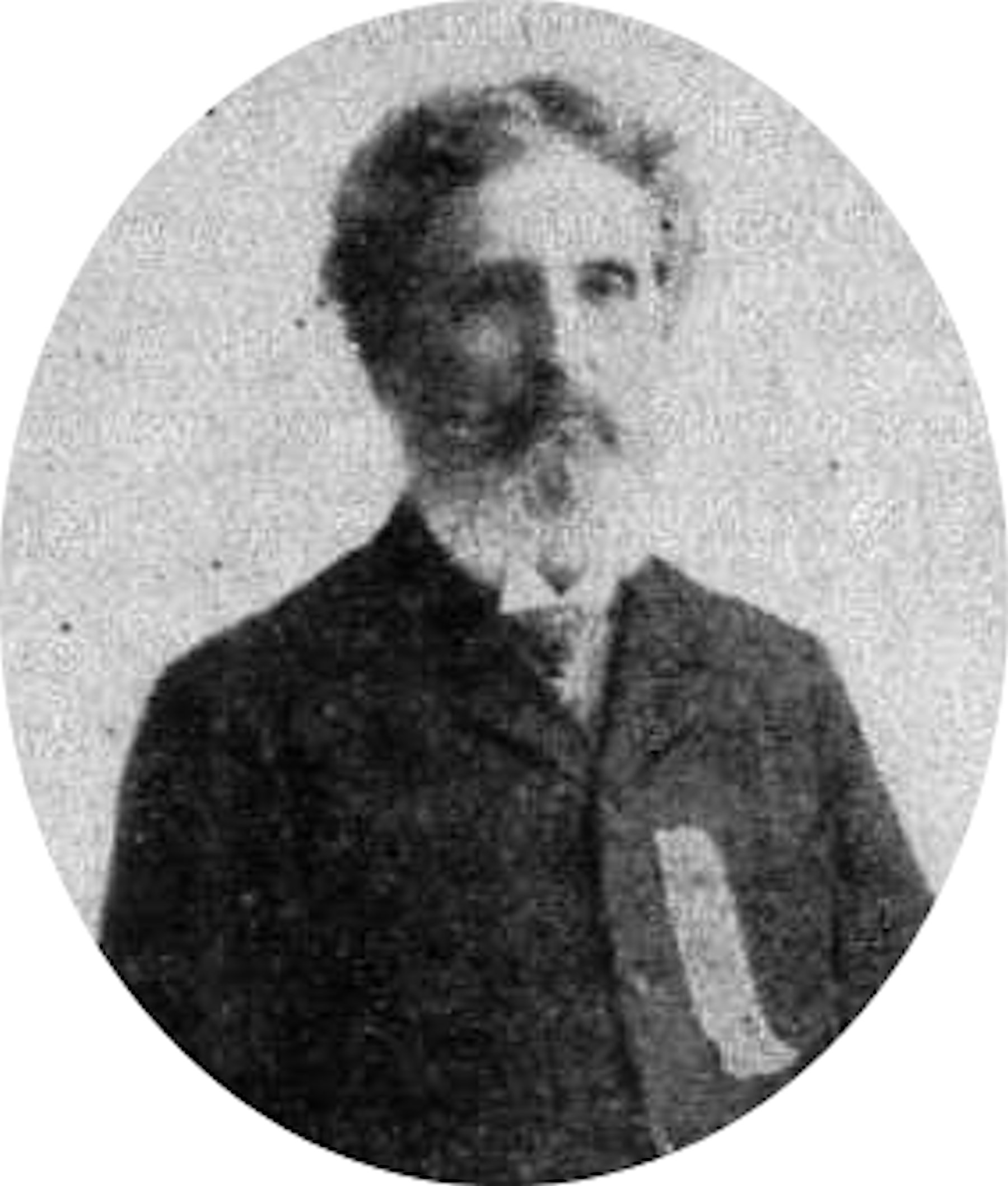
- Born: January 10, 1838; Bath, New Hampshire, U.S.
- Died: April 12, 1925 (aged 87)
- Burial place: Rock Creek Cemetery; Washington, D.C., U.S.
- Military career
- Allegiance: United States
- Branch: United States Army
- Rank: First Sergeant
- Units: Company G, 11th New Hampshire Volunteer Infantry
- Conflicts: American Civil War
- Awards: Medal of Honor

Francis Henry Goodall (January 10, 1838 – April 12, 1925) was a Union Army soldier in the American Civil War who received the U.S. military's highest decoration, the Medal of Honor.

Goodall was born in Bath, New Hampshire on January 10, 1838. He was awarded the Medal of Honor, for extraordinary heroism shown on December 13, 1862, while serving as a First Sergeant with Company G, 11th New Hampshire Volunteer Infantry, at Fredericksburg, Virginia. His Medal of Honor was issued on December 14, 1894.

He died at the age of 87, on April 12, 1925, and was buried at the Rock Creek Cemetery in Washington, D.C.

== Medal of Honor citation ==
The President of the United States of America, in the name of Congress, takes pleasure in presenting the Medal of Honor to First Sergeant Francis Henry Goodall, United States Army, for extraordinary heroism on 13 December 1862, while serving with Company G, 11th New Hampshire Infantry, in action at Fredericksburg, Virginia. With the assistance of another soldier First Sergeant Goodall brought a wounded comrade into the lines, under heavy fire.
