= Janet Wilson =

British academic (born 1948)

- Born: 2 November 1948 (age 77); Wellington
- Citizenship: New Zealand
- Known for: Research and writing on Postcolonial studies
- Spouse: Kevin Ireland

Academic background
- Education: Victoria University of Wellington; University of Sydney; St Catherine's College, Oxford
- Thesis: An edition of Roger Edgeworth's Sermons very fruitfull, godly and learned (from the 1557 edition and Bodl. MS Rawl. D. 831) (1985)
- Doctoral advisor: Douglas Gray, JRR Tolkien Professor of English Literature and Language, Lady Margaret Hall, Oxford

Academic work
- Discipline: English
- Institutions: University of Northampton
- Website: pure.northampton.ac.uk/en/persons/janet-wilson-3

Janet M. Wilson is a UK-based New Zealand academic who specialises in post colonial New Zealand literature.

== Academic career ==
Janet Mary Wilson is emerita professor of English and postcolonial studies, Faculty of Arts, Science and Technology, University of Northampton and editor of the Journal of Postcolonial Writing and on the board of the Journal of New Zealand Literature.

Previous appointments were held at Birkbeck, University of London, University of Otago, Oxford Brookes University, University of Oxford, Trinity College Dublin, University of Auckland and University of Sydney.

Wilson was elected Vice President of the National Conference of University Professors in 2018 and became President in 2020 until 2022.

== Education ==
Wilson holds an MA in English from the Victoria University of Wellington, an MA in Medieval English from the University of Sydney and a DPhil from St Catherine's College, Oxford.

== Professional life ==
Wilson currently holds a Visiting Professorship at Birmingham City University, is an Academic Visitor at University of Auckland and a Visiting Research Fellow at Rothermere American Institute University of Oxford where she was previously a Senior Research Fellow and an Associate Research Fellow. She was previously a Visiting Fellow at Jamia Millia Islamia University.

== Awards and recognition ==
Wilson was a recipient of an Australian Commonwealth Fellowship at the University of Sydney (1972-1974) and a Violet Vaughan Morgan Studentship at St Catherine's College, Oxford (1980-1981).

== Personal life ==
Wilson was, until his death, married to the New Zealand writer and poet Kevin Ireland.

== Bibliography ==
- Gasston A, Kimber G, Wilson J (Eds.) (2020) Katherine Mansfield: New Directions Bloomsbury, London ISBN 9781350135529
- Wilson J (Ed.) (2020) The General and the Nightingale: Dan Davin's War Stories Otago University Press, Dunedin ISBN 9781988531823
- Stierstorfer K, Wilson J (Eds.) (2017) The Routledge Diaspora Studies Reader Routledge, London ISBN 9781138783201
- Tunca D, Wilson J (Eds.) (2016) Postcolonial Gateways and Walls: Under Construction Brill, Leiden ISBN 978-90-04-33767-1
- Ringrose C, Wilson J (Eds.) (2016) New Soundings in Postcolonial Writing: Critical and Creative Contours Brill- Rodopi, Leiden & Boston ISBN 978-90-04-32641-5
- Fresno Calleja P (Translator), Wilson J (Eds.) (2014) Un país de cuento. Veinte relatos de Nueva Zelanda Prensas de la Universidad de Zaragoza, Zaragoza ISBN 978-8416028382
- Kimber G, da Sousa Correa D, Wilson J (Eds.) (2013) Katherine Mansfield and the (Post)colonial Edinburgh University Press, Edinburgh ISBN 9780748669110
- Wilson J, Kimber G, Reid S (Eds.) (2011) Katherine Mansfield and Literary Modernism. London: Continuum Bloomsbury, London ISBN 9781441111302
- Kimber G, Wilson J (Eds.) (2011) Celebrating Katherine Mansfield: A Centenary Volume of Essays Palgrave, London ISBN 978-0-230-27773-1
- Wilson J, Sandru C, Lawson Welsh S (Eds.) (2010) Rerouting the Postcolonial: New Directions for the New Millennium Routledge. London ISBN 9780415543255
- Wilson J (2008) Fleur Adcock Northcote House and the British Council, Plymouth ISBN 978-0-7463-1035-9
- Wilson J (Ed.) (2007) The Gorse Blooms Pale: The Southland Stories of Dan Davin Otago University Press, Dunedin ISBN 978-1-877372-42-1
