= 1992 Birthday Honours (New Zealand) =

Awards list for New Zealand

The 1992 Queen's Birthday Honours in New Zealand, celebrating the official birthday of Elizabeth II, were appointments made by the Queen in her right as Queen of New Zealand, on the advice of the New Zealand government, to various orders and honours to reward and highlight good works by New Zealanders. They were announced on 13 June 1992.

The recipients of honours are displayed here as they were styled before their new honour.

== Knight Bachelor ==
- Richard Henry Alwyn Carter – of Auckland. For services to business management.
- Donald Conroy McIntyre CBE – of Bromley, United Kingdom. For services to opera.

== Order of Saint Michael and Saint George ==
=== Companion (CMG) ===
- Ronald Hugh Arbuckle – of Upper Hutt. For services to science and industry.
- The Right Honourable Duncan MacIntyre DSO OBE ED – of Waipukurau. For public services.
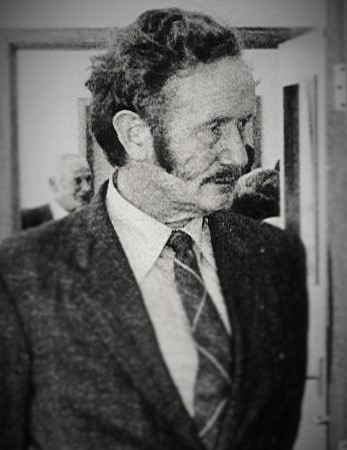
Duncan MacIntyre

== Order of the British Empire ==
=== Dame Commander (DBE) ===
Civil division

- Rangimārie Hetet CBE – of Te Kūiti. For services to traditional Māori arts and crafts.
- Dr Norma Jean Restieaux – of Dunedin. For services to cardiology.
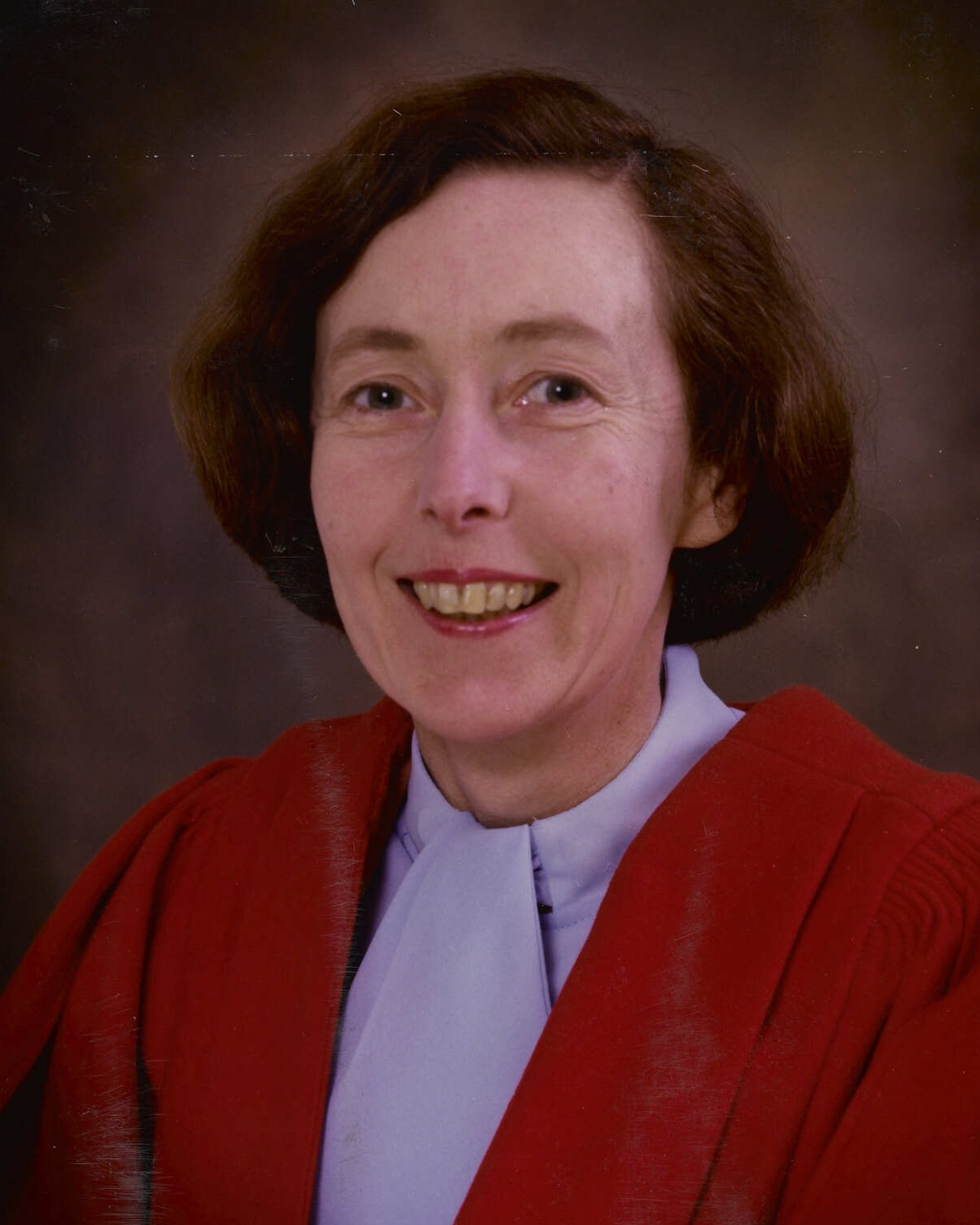
Dame Norma Restieaux

=== Commander (CBE) ===
Civil division

- Dr William Stewart Alexander – of Wellington. For service to medicine, especially pathology.
- Kenneth Francis Leslie Carter – of Auckland. For services to business management.
- Maurice Rhodes Carter OBE JP – of Christchurch. For services to local-body and community affairs.
- Joan Loraine Cockburn JP – of Hastings. For services to the New Zealand Red Cross Society and the community.
- Margaret Isabel Nicholls – of Hamilton. For services to nursing and the community.
- Brian Henry Charles Tyler – of Wellington; lately Controller and Auditor-General.
- John George Walker OBE – of Auckland. For services to athletics.

Military division

- Air Commodore Kenneth Arthur Gayfer AFC – Royal New Zealand Air Force.
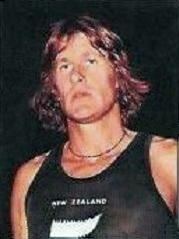
John Walker

=== Officer (OBE) ===
Civil division

- Ailsa Bailey JP – of Timaru. For services to gerontological nursing.
- David Joseph Braithwaite – of Hamilton. For services to the Trustbank organisation and the community.
- Christopher Keith Doig – of Wellington. For services to the arts.
- John Barnett Falconer JP – of Gore. For services to farming.
- Denis Clive Hulme – of Te Puke. For services to motor sport.
- Kevin Mark Ireland – of Auckland. For services to literature.
- Dudley Cameron Lane JP – of Hamilton. For services to the dairy industry.
- Anthony Gwynne Lawrence – of Masterton. For services to the wool industry.
- Peter Athol Low – of Invercargill. For services to acclimatisation and the law.
- Professor William David McIntyre – of Christchurch. For services to historical research.
- Barry John Charles Marsh – of New Plymouth. For service to surf lifesaving and the community.
- David John O'Sullivan – of Matamata. For services to Thoroughbred racing.
- Gordon Murray Reeves JP – of Te Puke. For services to farming and the community.
- Ngaire Kirkpatrick Simpson – of Te Puke. For services to nursing.
- Christine Margaret Taylor JP – of Auckland. For services to community mental health.
- Helen Patricia White – of Ōtāne. For services to equestrian sport.
- Keith Budgewell Yealands – of Blenheim. For services to marine farming.

Military division

- Group Captain John Worden MBE – Royal New Zealand Air Force.
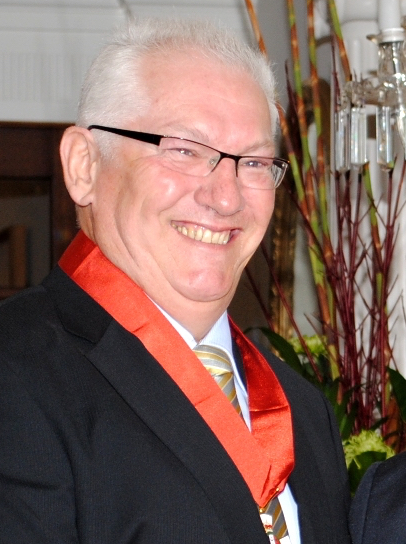
Chris Doig

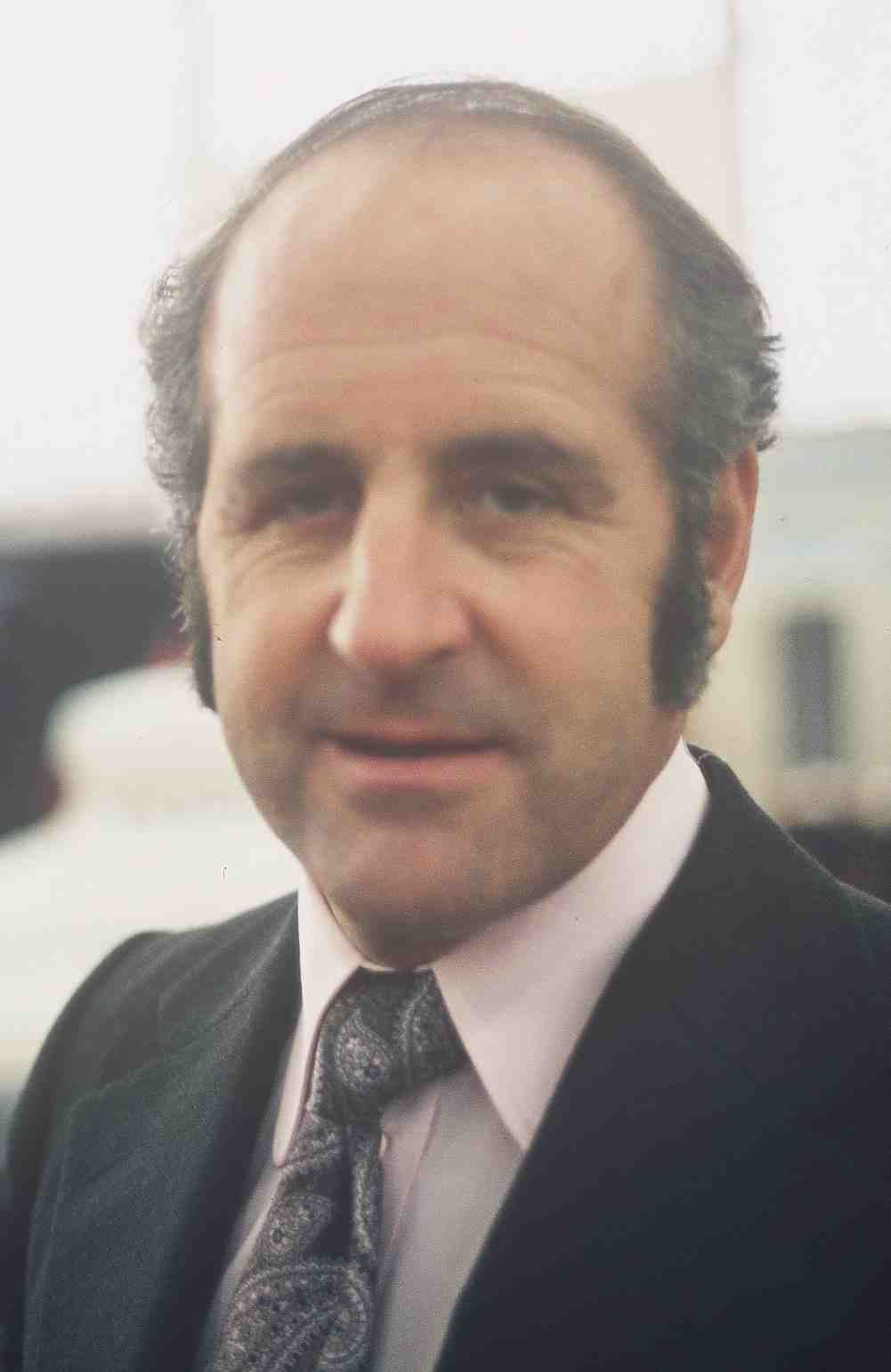
Denny Hulme

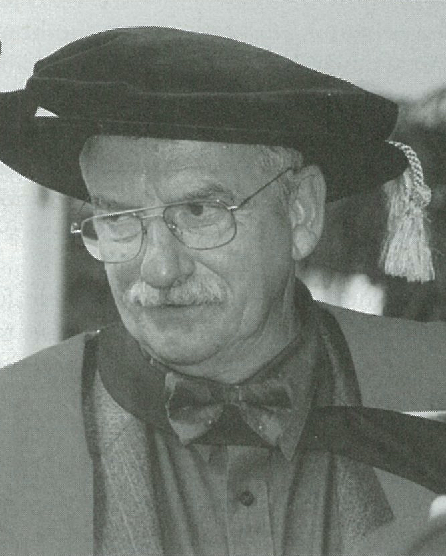
Kevin Ireland

=== Member (MBE) ===
Civil division

- Robert Henry Arvidson JP – of Pukekohe. For services to the community.
- Peter Thomas Gubbins Barry – of Rotorua. For services to the wool industry.
- Valerie Margaret Blennerhassett – of Wellington. For services to the family.
- Arthur Frederick Collier – of Taihape. For services to farming and the community.
- Robert Paul Davidson – of Ashburton. For services to harness racing.
- Jennifer Hilda Harvey Familton – of Christchurch. For services to education and the community.
- Garry Alexander John Frew – of Whangārei. For services to sport.
- Rita Clarice Graham – of Auckland. For services to the hearing impaired.
- Phoebe Florence Heather – of Hamilton. For services to marriage guidance counselling.
- Archibald Campbell Houstoun JP – of Timaru. For services to local government.
- James Douglas Howland JP – of Putāruru. For services to local-body and community affairs.
- Philip Joseph Jew – of Auckland. For services to horticulture and conservation.
- Betty Lorna Loughhead JP – of Wellington. For services to Soroptimist International and the community.
- Professor John Davidson McCraw – of Hamilton. For services to earth sciences.
- Edwin Mervyn Mathison JP – of Auckland. For services to the Order of St John and the community.
- Charles Tohara Mohi – of Hastings. For services to the community.
- Ngawhata Eliza Page – of Chatham Islands. For services to the community.
- Aroha Carl Pfeifer – of Tauranga. For services to the community.
- Patricia Riley – of Auckland. For services to education.
- Patrick Richard Sale – of Tauranga. For services to horticulture.
- Natalie Phyllis Smith – of Upper Hutt. For services to the community.
- John Andrew Sturgeon – of Runanga. For services to sport, in particular rugby.
- Ivan Mathew Henry Vodanovich – of Wellington. For services to rugby.
- John Alexander Wells – of Auckland. For services to bowls.
- Richard Murray (Rick) Wells – of Auckland. For services as a triathlete.

Military division

- Lieutenant Commander Bruce Pepperell – Royal New Zealand Navy.
- Warrant Officer Class 1 (Honorary Lieutenant) Ronald Henry Pledger – Royal New Zealand Infantry Regiment (Territorial Force).
- Warrant Officer Derek Edward Ashurst – Royal New Zealand Air Force.
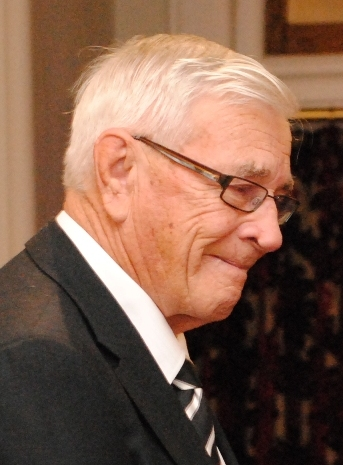
John Sturgeon

== British Empire Medal (BEM) ==
Military division

- Chief Petty Officer Rex Rodgers – Royal New Zealand Navy.
- Staff Sergeant (Acting Warrant Officer Class 2) Alexander Robert McGregor – Royal New Zealand Corps of Signals.
- Sergeant Brian Charles Powell – Corps of Royal New Zealand Engineers.
- Flight Sergeant James Arthur O'Brien – Royal New Zealand Air Force.

== Companion of the Queen's Service Order (QSO) ==
=== For community service ===
- Jessie Margaret, Lady Marshall – of Wellington.
- Dr Lawrence Fergusson Taylor – of Auckland.
- Helen Tennent JP – of Dannevirke.
- Mary Veronica White (Sister Mary Edmund) – of Mount Maunganui.
- Ronald Earl Wilton JP – of Christchurch.
- Ingeborg Woolf – of Wellington.

=== For public services ===
- Brian Kevin Arnold – of Dunedin.
- Dr The Honourable Michael Edward Rainton Bassett – of Auckland.
- The Honourable William Alex Fraser – of Dunedin.
- Ann Philippa Grigg – of Ashburton.
- Stuart Alisdair Macaskill JP – of Upper Hutt.
- The Honourable Allan McCready – of Waikanae.
- Donald Wallace Middleton JP – of Taumarunui.
- Yvonne Telford Shadbolt – of Auckland.
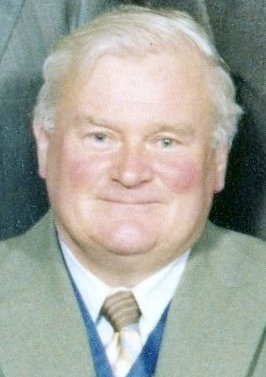
Brian Arnold

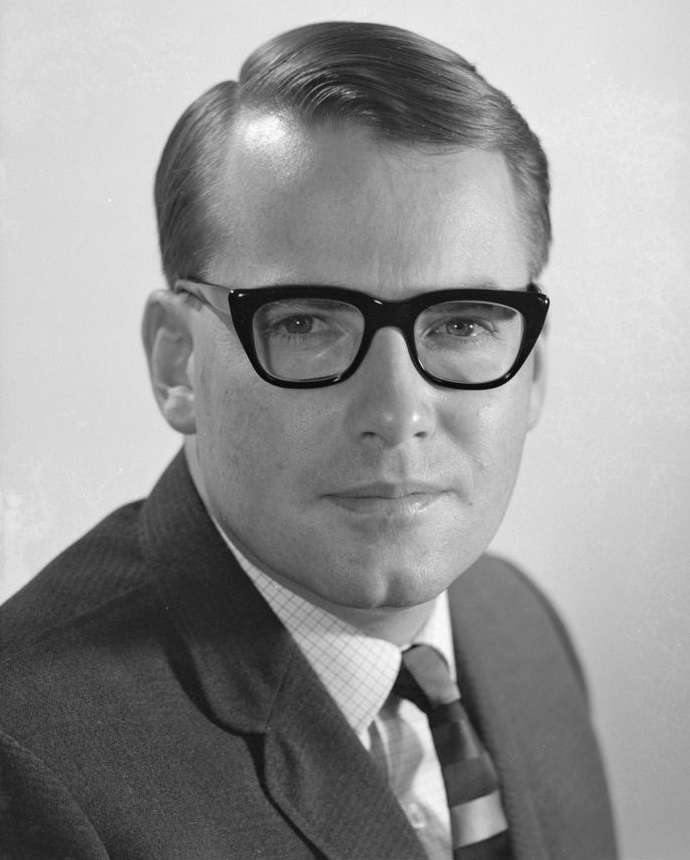
Michael Bassett

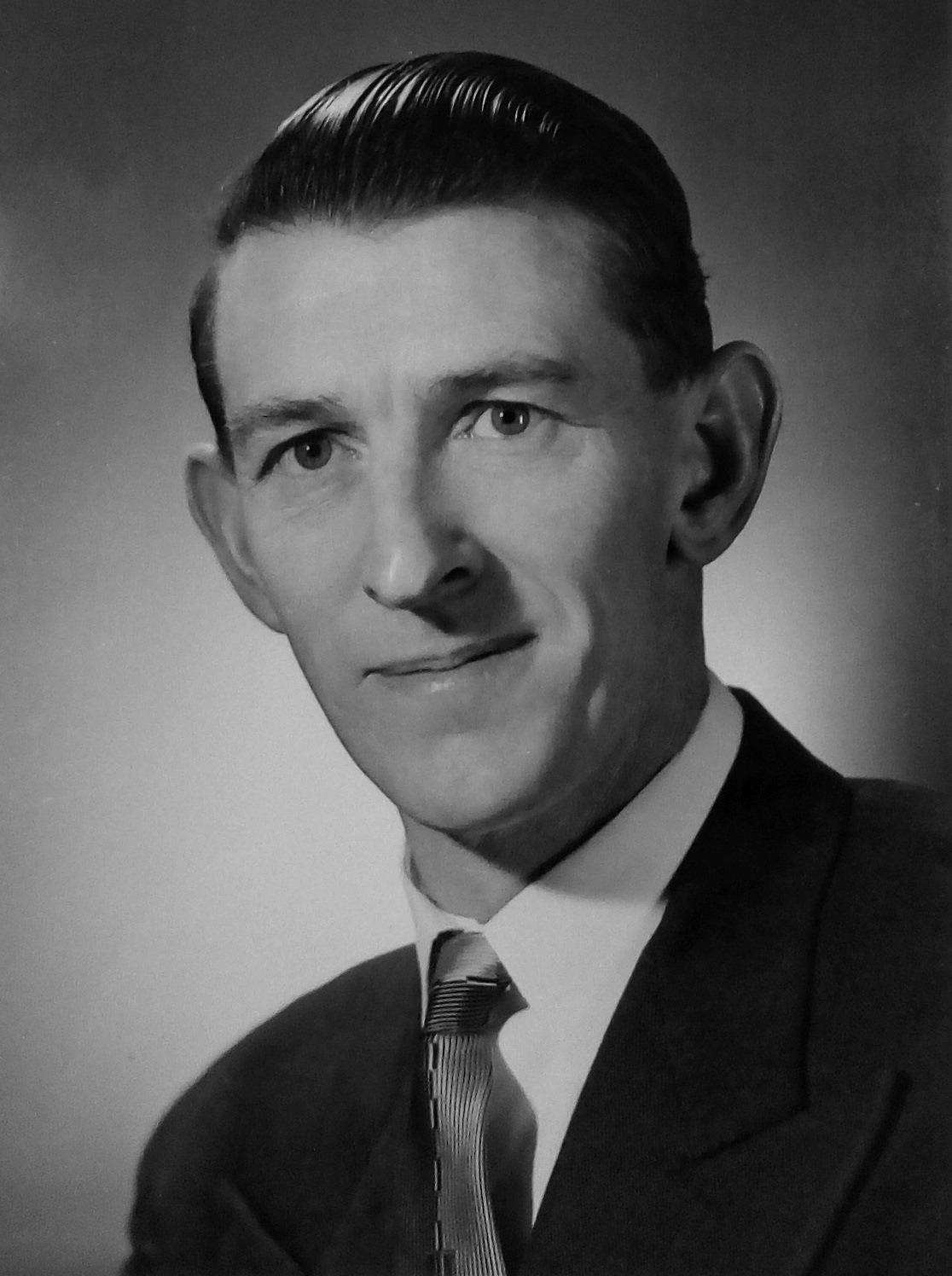
Bill Fraser

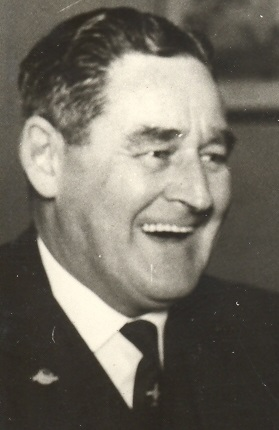
Allan McCready

== Queen's Service Medal (QSM) ==
=== For community service ===
- Colin Charles Addison – of Wellington.
- Marion Elizabeth Barnes – of Wellington.
- Keith Lawley Brown JP – of Wellington.
- Alfred Donald Dalbeth – of Dargaville.
- Elaine Jean Dawson – of Pukekohe.
- Colin Richard Dorsey – of Oamaru.
- Phyllis Annie Dromgoole – of Auckland.
- Ian Kelvin Dunbar – of Amberley.
- Eva Esther Gilmore – of Christchurch.
- Winifred Jean Hamilton – of Gore.
- Douglas Gordon Holmes – of Hamilton.
- Claire Marie Horrell – of Gore.
- Edward Hughes – of Christchurch.
- Marjorie Joyce Jenden – of Paraparaumu Beach.
- Freda Jessie Keith – of Auckland.
- Eliza Malia Kerrigan – of Auckland.
- Piri Takakino Mamaeroa Kutia – of Tolaga Bay.
- Frank Larking – of Auckland.
- Gerald Andrew Provo McKissock – of Timaru.
- Ivy Lily May Morris – of Heriot.
- Margaret Frances Mulholland – of Wedderburn.
- Jessie Margaret Ovenden – of Auckland.
- David William Robinson – of Hāwera.
- Lieutenant Colonel Percy Lionel Smith – of Wellington.
- Dorothy Spiers – of Murchison.
- Michael David Studholme JP – of Waimate.
- John Wilson Sutherland – of Oamaru.
- Timothy Birmingham Te Maiharoa – of Moeraki.
- William Robert Vickery – of Masterton.
- Patricia Kathleen Walker – of Hunterville.
- Kathleen Margaret Walter – of Westport.
- Annie Campbell Watt – of Pukekohe.
- Keith Ian Williamson – of Palmerston North.

=== For public services ===
- Olive Bernadette Blomfield – of Russell.
- Richard Eustace Edward Blomfield – of Russell.
- Alan Brabender – of Woodville.
- Burnett Hereward Love (Jack) Bull – of Greytown.
- Kenneth James Burrows – sergeant, New Zealand Police.
- Ernest Colin Carr – of Ranfurly.
- Frederick Desmond Coe – of Rotorua.
- Wynne Colgan – of Auckland.
- Brian Kenhardt Crawshaw JP – of Gisborne.
- Patrick Eamon Dempsey JP – of Auckland.
- Shirley Elizabeth Fairey – of New Plymouth.
- Gladys Mary Goodall JP – of Christchurch.
- William Leslie Griffin JP – of Paraparaumu Beach.
- Barbara Doris Hall – of Christchurch.
- Neil Frederick Harris – of Christchurch.
- Margaret Jane Hislop – of Kaikōura.
- Adrian Stanley Hodgson – senior constable, New Zealand Police (retired).
- Marion Claire Kelly – of Ōhope.
- Trevor Wesley King – of Christchurch.
- Roland William George Kingston – of Dunedin.
- Gilbert Leslie Laurenson – of Ōkaihau.
- Mary Morison McLaren – of Auckland.
- Gordon Wilfred Michie – of Auckland.
- Joan Mary O'Sullivan – of Waiuku.
- Arthur Leslie Patterson JP – of Te Awamutu.
- Elsie Daphne Porter JP – of Auckland.
- Stanley Morphena Rule – of Christchurch.
- Lieutenant Colonel Adam Gibson Scott – of Dunedin.
- Myra Elizabeth Walker – of Christchurch.
- Valerie Daisy Wallace – of Ōpunake.
- Thomas William Weir JP – of Akaroa.
- Willian Percy Wellington – of Dunedin.
- Mere Margaret Whakatope – of Wairoa.
- Barbara Phyllis White – of Hampshire, United Kingdom (formerly of Nelson).

== Royal Red Cross ==
=== Member (RRC) ===
- Lieutenant Colonel Jan Marjorie Grant – colonel commandant, Royal New Zealand Nursing Corps (Territorial Force).

== Queen's Fire Service Medal (QFSM) ==
- John Henry Grenfell – chief fire officer, Clyde Volunteer Fire Brigade, New Zealand Fire Service.
- Garry Robert Smith – deputy chief fire officer, Carterton Volunteer Fire Brigade, New Zealand Fire Service.
- Ronald John Turton – chief fire officer, Huntly Volunteer Fire Brigade, New Zealand Fire Service.

== Queen's Police Medal (QPM) ==
- Ross Howard Pinkham – detective inspector, New Zealand Police.
