= John McCraw =

New Zealand soil scientist and local historian

John McCraw MBE CRSNZ
- Born: John Davidson McCraw; 13 March 1925; Dunedin, New Zealand
- Died: 14 December 2014 (aged 89); Hamilton, New Zealand
- Education: University of Otago; Victoria University of Wellington
- Awards: MBE (1992); Companion of the Royal Society of New Zealand (2005)
- Scientific career
- Fields: Pedology
- Workplaces: New Zealand Soil Bureau; University of Waikato
- Thesis: Papers on soils in New Zealand and Antarctica (1968)

John Davidson McCraw MBE CRSNZ (13 March 1925 – 14 December 2014) was a New Zealand pedologist, academic, and local historian, particularly of the Central Otago area. The McCraw Glacier in Antarctica is named for him.

== Biography ==
Born in Dunedin in 1925, McCraw was interested in science from an early age, becoming a member the junior group of the Otago branch of the Royal Society of New Zealand when he was 10 years old. He attended the University of Otago, from where he graduated with a Master of Science with second-class honours in geology in 1948.

McCraw then had a 20-year career as a pedologist with the Soil Bureau of the Department of Scientific and Industrial Research, based first in Alexandra in Central Otago from 1949 to 1963 and then in Hamilton. He led the Soil Bureau's first Antarctic expedition in 1959–60, undertaking soil surveys in the Taylor Valley and on the Ross Sea coast.

In 1968 McCraw earned a Doctor of Science degree from Victoria University of Wellington on the basis of 13 papers on soils in New Zealand and Antarctica.

McCraw was appointed as the foundation professor in the newly established Department of Earth Sciences at the University of Waikato in 1970, and served as the university's dean of science between 1975 and 1984. On his retirement from Waikato in 1988, McCraw was granted the title of emeritus professor.

In retirement, McCraw found the time to devote to researching the history of Central Otago, in which he had become interested during his time at the Soil Bureau in Alexandra. He went on to publish about a dozen books on the history of the area and the wider Otago region, and was acknowledged as the leading authority on the Alexandra district. He also wrote the 1998 book Dunedin holocaust: the tragic fire in the Octagon Buildings, Dunedin, 1879 about the 1879 Octagon fire, and The wandering river: landforms and geological history of the Hamilton basin, published in 2011.

Throughout his life, McCraw served on a range of community, professional and public committees, organisations and inquiries. In 1957 he was a member of the organizing committee for the inaugural Alexandra Blossom Festival. He served as president of the Waikato branch of the Royal Society of New Zealand between 1965 and 1966 and was a member of the society's geology and quaternary national committees from 1975 to 1982. In 1968 he chaired the Waikato branch of the Geological Society of New Zealand. He also served on the National Water and Soil Authority from 1976 to 1985, and the commission of inquiry into the Abbotsford landslip disaster between 1979 and 1980. He chaired the government's 1988 Rabbit and Land Management Task Force and the public consultation committee for the Hamilton City Council pollution control scheme from 1994 to 1996. He was patron of the Waikato Geological and Lapidary Society.

McCraw died in Hamilton in 2014 and was buried at Hamilton Park Cemetery.

== Honours and awards ==
In the 1992 Queen's Birthday Honours, McCraw was appointed a Member of the Order of the British Empire, for services to earth sciences. He was made a Fellow of the New Zealand Society of Soil Science in 1995, and in 2005 he was elected as a Companion of the Royal Society of New Zealand in recognition of his promotion and encouragement of science and technology. In 2008, he received a special award at the Central Otago Community Awards for his vital role in the preservation of knowledge and understanding of the history of Alexandra and the surrounding districts.

== Honorific eponym ==
In 1979, a glacier in the Britannia Range in Antarctica was named McCraw Glacier, in honour of McCraw, by a geological field party from the University of Waikato led by Michael Selby. The John McCraw Research Room at the Central Stories Museum and Art Gallery in Alexandra is also named for him.

== Selected works ==
- McCraw, John (2011). The wandering river: landforms and geological history of the Hamilton basin. Lower Hutt: Geoscience Society of New Zealand. ISBN 9781877480126.
- McCraw, John (2009). The gold baron: John Ewing, Central Otago's mining entrepreneur. Alexandra: Central Stories. ISBN 9780473156701.
- McCraw, John (2007). Early days on the Dunstan. Dunedin: Square One. ISBN 9780958270922.
- McCraw, John (2005). A fruitful land: the story of fruitgrowing and irrigation in the Alexandra–Clyde district. Dunedin: Square One. ISBN 9780908562015.
- McCraw, John (2003). Gold on the Dunstan. Dunedin: Square One. ISBN 9780908562596.
- McCraw, John (2002). The golden junction: episodes in Alexandra's history. Dunedin: Square One. ISBN 9780908562381.
- McCraw, John (2001). Harbour horror. Dunedin: Square One. ISBN 9780908562244.
- McCraw, John (2000). Mountain water & river gold: stories of gold mining in the Alexandra district. Dunedin: Square One. ISBN 9780908562046.
- McCraw, John (1999). Coastmaster: the story of Captain James B. Greig. Hamilton: Silverdale. ISBN 9780473062002.
- McCraw, John (1998). Dunedin holocaust: the tragic fire in the Octagon Buildings, Dunedin, 1879. Dunedin: Square One. ISBN 9780908562572.
- McCraw, John (1992). Mine fire: the 1906 coal-mine fire at Alexandra. Dunedin: Otago Heritage. ISBN 9780908774517.
- McCraw, John (1991). The siren's call: experiences in a volunteer fire brigade. Hamilton: Silverdale. ISBN 9780473011543.
- McCraw, John (1966). Soils of Ida Valley, Central Otago, N.Z. Soil Bureau, DSIR.
