= Strickland Goodall =

British cardiologist

Joseph Strickland Goodall FRSE FRCSE (25 May 1874 – 22 November 1934) was a British physician, clinical cardiologist, and physiologist. The triennial Strickland Goodall Memorial Lecture is named in his memory, and addresses cardiac issues.

== Life ==
Goodall was born in 1874 in Lincoln, Lincolnshire, the son of Anne Strickland Blaydes (d.1908) and her husband, Joseph Goodall (d.1901), senior surgeon in the Queensland Government Service. He was educated at Harrow School and Eastbourne then studied medicine at the University of London graduating with an MB. He did postgraduate study at the University of Edinburgh and in Paris. He became Professor of Physiology and Biology at the City of London Hospital.

In 1910, he was elected a Fellow of the Royal Society of Edinburgh. His proposers were John William Henry Eyre, John Cameron, Sir Thomas Oliver, and Arthur Robinson.

In 1914 he joined Dr Frederick William Price as a Physician at the newly built National Heart Hospital on Westmoreland Street in London.

He died on 22 November 1934.

== Family ==
He married Amelia Hunt. Their son, John Strickland Goodall, became a famous artist and illustrator.

== Publications ==
- The Electrical and Histological Manifestations of Thyrotoxic Myocarditis (1927)
- The Growth of Heart Disease in This and Other Countries (1928)
- Myocarditis: The St Cyres Memorial Lectures (published 1937)

== Memorial lectures ==
- 1939 – Diseases of the Heart – lecturer unknown
- 1948 – title not known – Prof John McMichael
- 1951 – The Heart in Thyrotoxicosis – T Jenner Hoskin
- 1954 – An Appreciation of Mitral Valve Disease – Dr Paul Wood
- 1957 – The Results of Surgical Treatment on Congenital Heart Diseases – Dr Maurice Campbell
- 1969 – The Nature of the Coronary Problem – Arthur Morgan Jones
