= Peter Goodall =

Australian academic and author (born 1949)

Peter Goodall (born 1949) is an Australian academic and author. In the mid-2000s he was Acting Dean of Humanities at Macquarie University in the absence of Dean Christina Slade. His substantive position was Deputy Dean of Humanities and Acting Head of the Politics and International Relations Department. By 2009 he had transferred to the University of Southern Queensland, Toowoomba campus where he was Dean of the Faculty of Arts.

In the 1980s Goodall broadcast a series of Weekend University programs on radio station, 2SER, detailing work of George Orwell and Evelyn Waugh. From 2004 Goodall has been the editor of AUMLA the journal of the Australasian Universities Language and Literature Association (AULLA).

Goodall specialises in the study of medieval literature especially Chaucer and twentieth-century literature especially Orwell. In 1995, he published High Culture, Popular Culture: the Long Debate on the division between high culture and popular culture. In 2009 he was the joint editor of Chaucer's Monk's Tale and Nun's Priest's Tale: An Annotated Bibliography 1900 to 2000, which details all published "editions, translations, and scholarship written on" two of Chaucer's tales, during the twentieth century. Goodall has worked on a cultural and literary study of the concept of privacy. In 2010 he co-authored a paper, "Information Retrieval and Social Tagging for Digital Libraries Using Formal Concept Analysis", delivered at the 8th International Conference on Computing and Communication Technologies and published in Research, Innovation and Vision for the Future (2010).

== Bibliography ==
- Goodall, Peter (reader) (1978). Patience (sound cassette) (in Middle English). Sydney: Macquarie University.
- Goodall, Peter; Stephens, John A; Claflin, Marie Louise (readers) (1978). Gawain and the Grene Knight [Sir Gawain and the Green Knight] (sound cassette) (in Middle English).
- Goodall, Peter (author, creator) (1981). In an Age Like This: the Life and Works of George Orwell (sound cassette). 2SER-FM.
- Goodall, Peter (author, creator) (1982). The Old Ambiguous World: the Life and Literature of Evelyn Waugh (sound cassette). 2SER-FM.
- Goodall, Peter (1995). High Culture, Popular Culture: The Long Debate. St Leonards, NSW: Allen & Unwin. ISBN 1-86373-833-9.
- Goodall, Peter (2002). Nineteen Eighty-Four. Marrickville, NSW: Science Press. ISBN 0-85583-438-2.
- Goodall, Peter; Greentree, Rosemary; Bright, Christopher, eds. (2009). Chaucer's Monk's Tale and Nun's Priest's Tale: An Annotated Bibliography 1900 to 2000. annotations by Geoffrey Cooper, Peter Goodall, John Gray, Bruce Moore, Diane Speed, Jennifer Strauss, J.A. Stephens, Ruth Waterhouse, Christopher Wortham. Toronto: University of Toronto Press. ISBN 978-0-80209-320-2. Note: [online] copy is a preview and some pages may not be available.
