= Norma Restieaux =

New Zealand cardiologist (born 1934)

Dame Norma Restieaux DBE
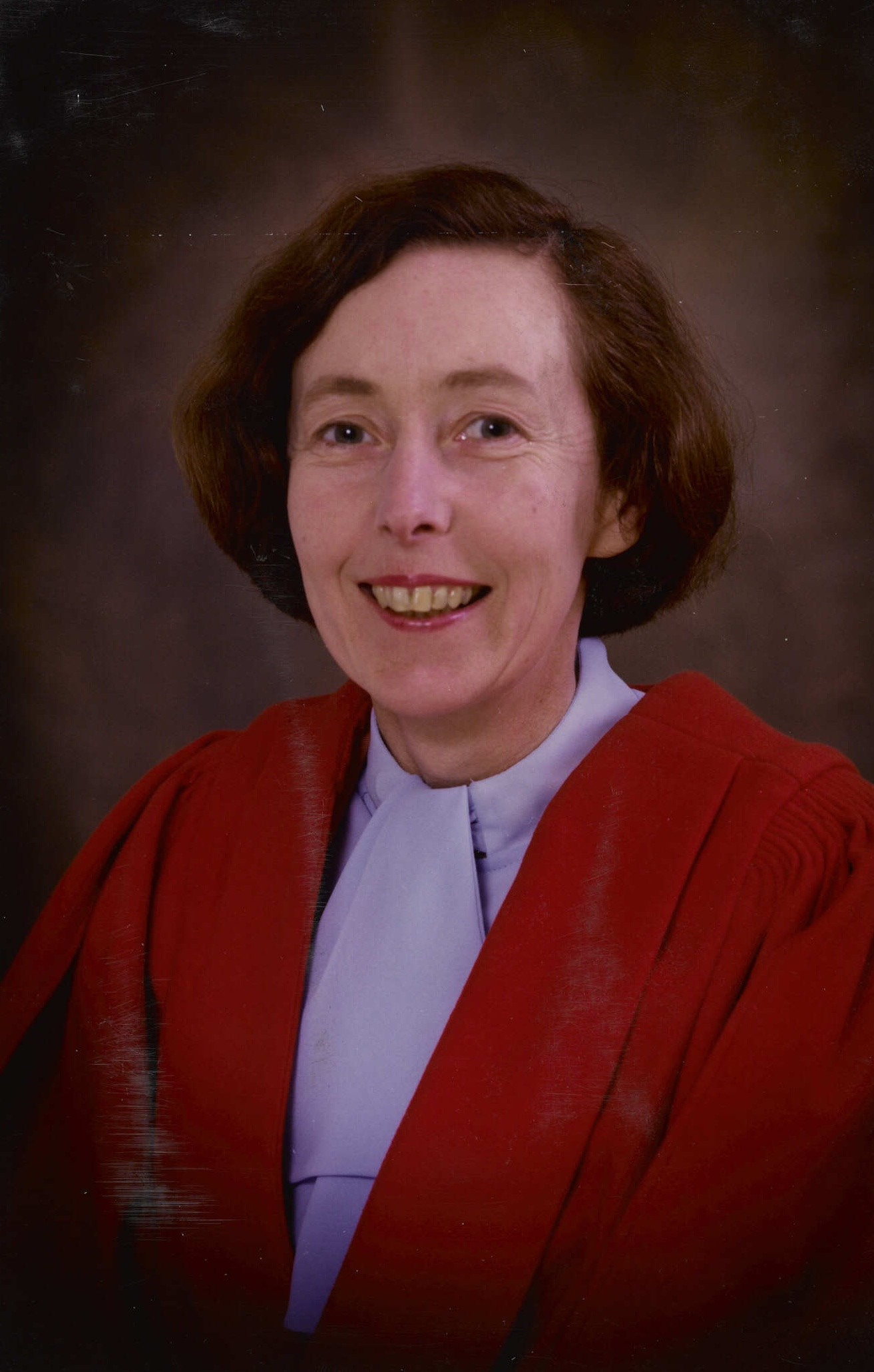
- Restieaux in 1981
- Born: Norma Jean Restieaux; 16 July 1934 (age 92); Dunedin, New Zealand

Academic background
- Education: University of Otago

Academic work
- Discipline: Cardiology
- Institutions: University of Otago

Dame Norma Jean Restieaux DBE (born 16 July 1934) is a New Zealand physician, medical researcher, cardiologist and author.

== Early life ==
Restieaux was born in the Dunedin suburb of St Kilda on 16 July 1934, the daughter of Frank Charles Restieaux (1911–1976) and Florence Jean May Restieaux (née Godfrey; 1908–1996). She was educated at Otago Girls' High School.

== Career ==
Restieaux studied medicine at the University of Otago, graduating Bachelor of Medical Science in 1958, and MB ChB in 1960. She then undertook specialist cardiology training in London and Boston, before returning to Dunedin in 1970. Restieaux was mentored by John Hunter, professor of medicine at Otago in the early stages of her career, and rose to become head of the Cardiology Department at Dunedin Hospital, consultant cardiologist for the Otago Health Board and associate professor at the University of Otago.

In 1999, Restieaux became the first female president of the New Zealand Medical Association. The following year, she became the first woman from New Zealand to be president of the Royal Australasian College of Physicians.

== Selected publications ==
She authored or co-authored the following:

- Tang, E. W. (2006). "Clinical outcome of older patients with acute coronary syndrome over the last three decades". Age Ageing. 35: 280–285. doi:10.1093/ageing/afj079.
- Tang, E; Wong, CK; Wilkins, G; Herbison, P; Williams, M; Kay, P; Restieaux, N (2005). "Use of evidence-based management for acute coronary syndrome". N Z Med J. 118: U1678. PMID 16224502..
- Fearnley, D; McLean, J; Wilkins, G; Restieaux, N; Nixon, G (2002). "Audit of a collaborative care model suggests patients with acute myocardial infarction are not disadvantaged by treatment in a rural hospital". N Z Med J. 115: U239. PMID 12552285..
- Stewart, RA; Robertson, MC; Low, CJ; Wilkins, GT; Restieaux, NJ (1997). "Differences in easily recognised coronary risk factors by age at first myocardial infarction". N Z Med J. 110: 339–40. PMID 9323375..
- Sutherland, WH; Restieaux, NJ; Nye, ER; Williams, MJ; de Jong, SA; Robertson, MC; Walker, HL (1998). "IDL composition and angiographically determined progression of atherosclerotic lesions during simvastatin therapy". Arterioscler Thromb Vasc Biol. 18: 577–83. doi:10.1161/01.atv.18.4.577. PMID 9555863..

== Honours ==
In the 1992 Queen's Birthday Honours, Restieaux was appointed a Dame Commander of the Order of the British Empire, for services to cardiology.
