= Bath Covered Bridge =

- U.S. National Register of Historic Places
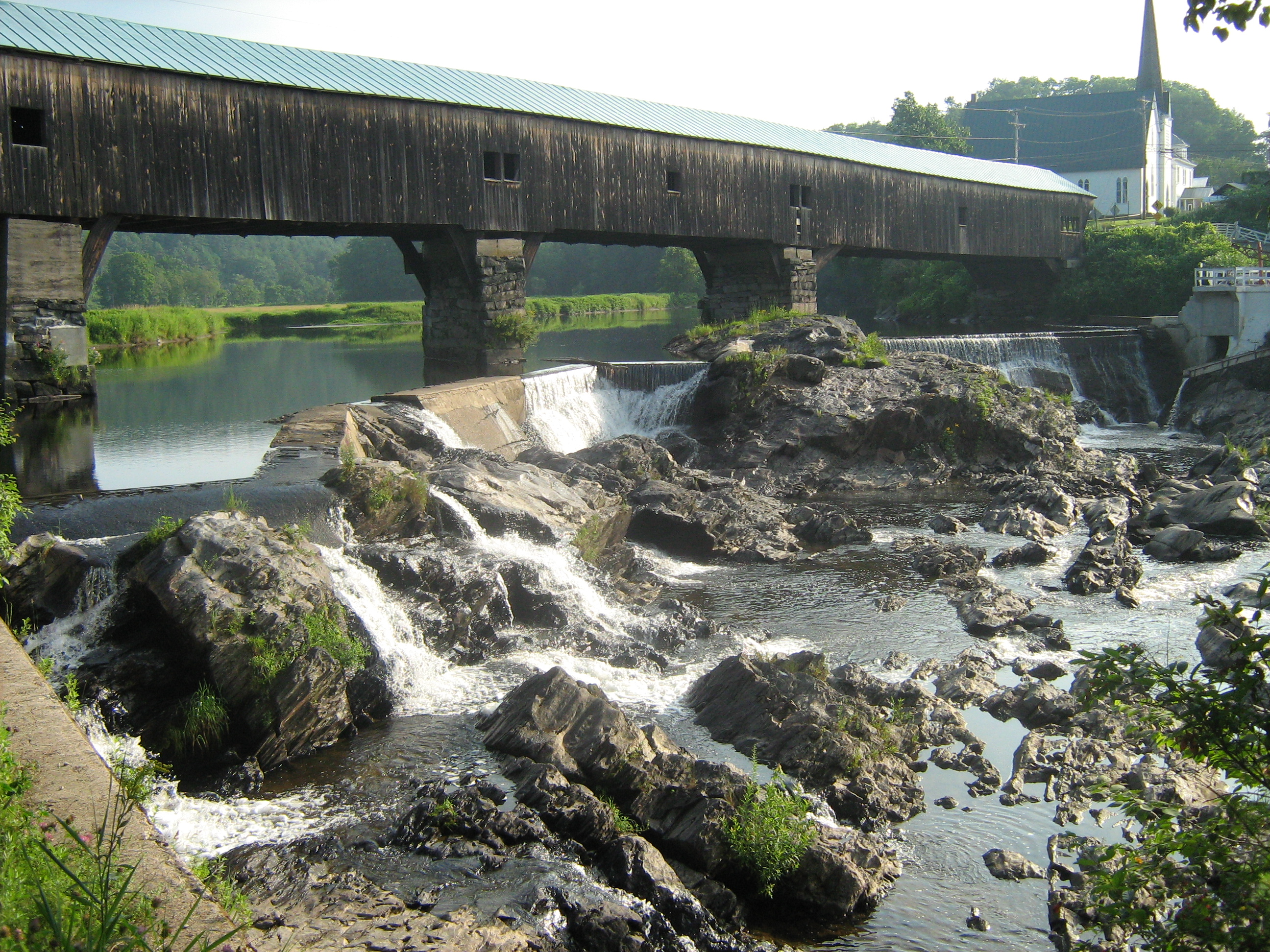
- Bath Covered Bridge in 2010

- Location within New Hampshire Location within the United States
- Location: Off US 302, NH 10, Bath, New Hampshire
- Coordinates: 44°10′1″N 71°58′2″W
- Area: 0.3 acres (0.12 ha)
- Built: 1832
- Architectural style: Burr truss
- NRHP reference No.: 76000125
- Added to NRHP: September 01, 1976

The Bath Covered Bridge is a historic covered bridge over the Ammonoosuc River off US 302 and NH 10 in Bath, New Hampshire. Built in 1832, it is one of the state's oldest surviving covered bridges. It was listed on the National Register of Historic Places in 1976, and underwent a major rehabilitation in the 2010s.

== Description and history ==
The Bath Covered Bridge is located on the west side of the village center of Bath, carrying West Bath Road over the Ammonoosuc River. Built in 1832 for $3,300, the Bath Covered Bridge spans the Ammonoosuc River in Bath. At 375 feet and four spans, it is the longest covered bridge entirely within New Hampshire.

Local carpenter George Wetherell oversaw its construction, with masonry by Luther Butler and hand-wrought nails made by Amasa Buck. The bridge consists of four spans resting on stone piers and abutments, and is finished with vertical board siding. When originally built, it had only three spans, but when the bridge was raised in the 1920s, a third pier was added, along with laminated arches to strengthen it.

The bridge is the fifth to stand on this site, where a bridge has stood since at least 1794. That bridge was washed away by flooding in 1806, as were subsequent bridges in 1820 and 1826. The fourth bridge was destroyed by fire in 1830. The bridge serves a primarily rural residential population, and sees relatively little traffic. The bridge was closed to traffic in October 2012 for safety, structural, and cosmetic reasons. After 21 months and $3 million in repairs, it re-opened in August 2014.

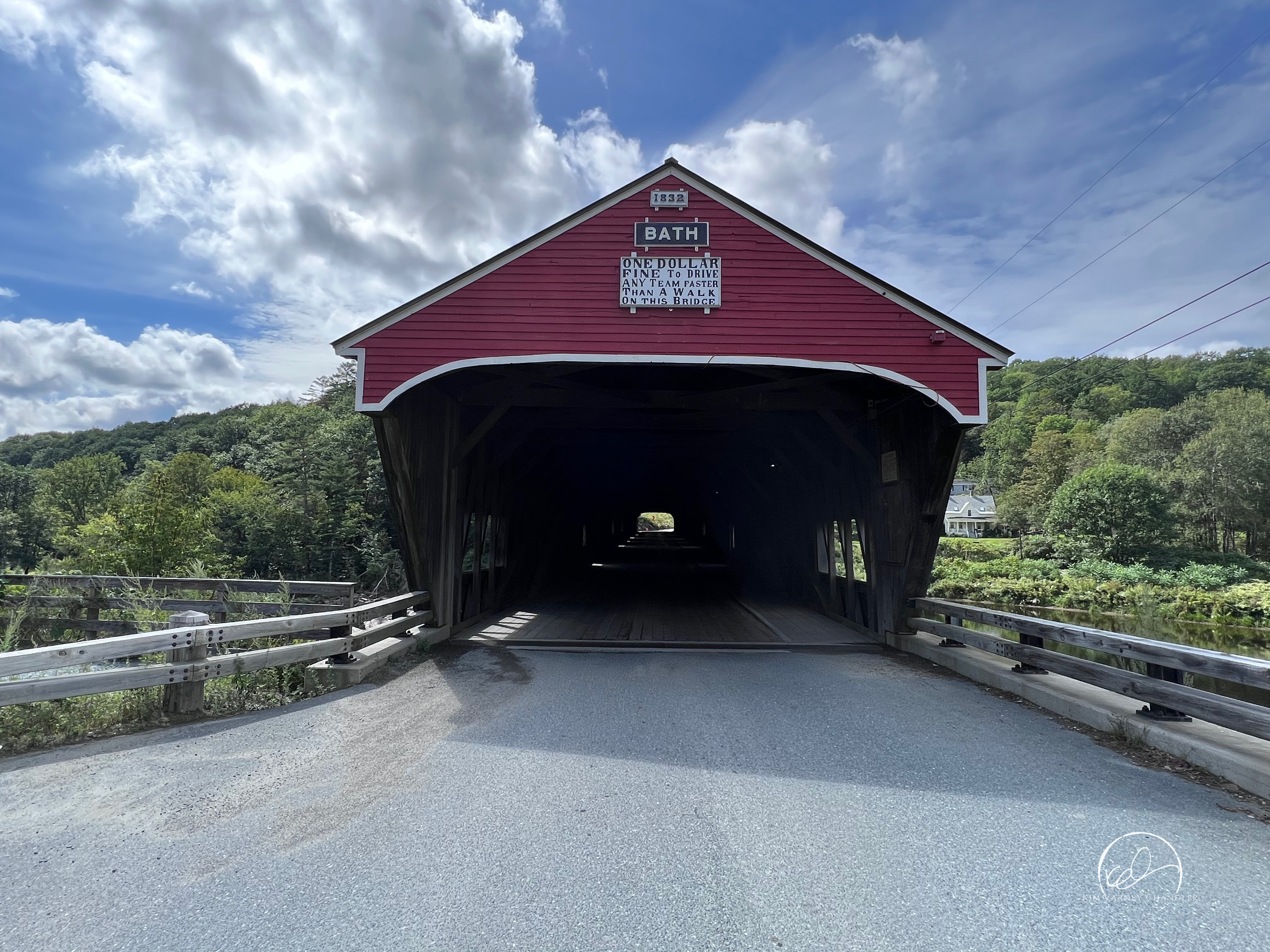
Bath Bridge, 2023

== See also ==
- List of bridges documented by the Historic American Engineering Record in New Hampshire
- List of bridges on the National Register of Historic Places in New Hampshire
- List of covered bridges in New Hampshire
- National Register of Historic Places listings in Grafton County, New Hampshire
