= Thomas Goodall =

- 1808 (after Samuel Drummond)
- Born: 1767; Bristol
- Died: 1832 (aged 64–65)
- Spouse: Charlotte Goodall

Thomas Goodall (1767–1832) was a British merchant captain. He had an exciting career, which he was involved in describing, as the "admiral of Hayti" working for Henri Christophe in the struggle for independence. He wrote a play and married Charlotte Goodall. He hired William Garrow to successfully sue his lawyer for taking his money and his wife.

== Life ==
Goodall was born in Bristol in 1767. He was bound to be a lawyer but he ran away to sea at the age of thirteen to the caribbean. He was on board HMS Triton at the Battle of the Saintes in 1782.

Goodall was a British merchant captain. He had an exciting career which he was involved in describing as the "admiral of Hayti". He wrote a play and married Charlotte Goodall in 1787 after seeing her appear in Bath. He sued his lawyer for taking his money and his wife. The circumstances of this case was published with Goodall as prime author. The 22-page document was sub-titled "The Love-Sick Lawyer" and it recorded the circumstances, the witnesses and the £5,000 verdict won by Goodall's barrister Sir William Garrow.
