= William Goodell =

William Goodell may refer to:

- William Goodell (abolitionist) (1792–1878), American abolitionist and reformer
- William Goodell (gynecologist) (1829–1894), American gynecologist
- William Goodell (missionary) (1792–1867), American missionary
- William Newport Goodell (1908–1999), American artist, craftsman, and educator
