= George Goodall =

Australian rules footballer

Personal information
- Full name: George Edward Goodall
- Born: 10 July 1891; Footscray, Victoria
- Died: 6 August 1963 (aged 72); Pascoe Vale, Victoria
- Original team: South Melbourne Juniors
- Height: 173 cm (5 ft 8 in)
- Weight: 71 kg (157 lb)

Playing career^{1}
Years	Club	Games (Goals)
1913–14	Collingwood	3 (0)
- ^{1} Playing statistics correct to the end of 1914.

George Edward Goodall (10 July 1891 – 6 August 1963) was an Australian rules footballer who played with Collingwood in the Victorian Football League (VFL).
