= Charlotte Goodall =

British actress (1766–1830)

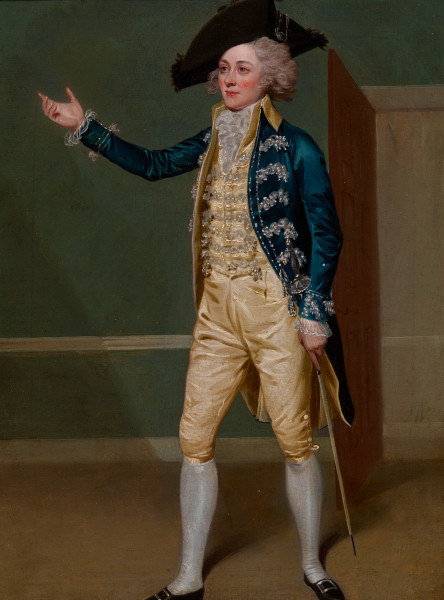
- c. 1792 by Samuel De Wilde
- Born: Charlotte Stanton; 1766
- Died: July 1830 (aged 63–64); Somers Town, London
- Occupation: actor
- Spouse: Thomas Goodall
- Children: eight (six survived)

Mrs Goodall or Charlotte Goodall or Charlotte Stanton (1766 – July 1830) was a British actress known for her comedy roles at Drury Lane. She married Thomas Goodall and they were involved in a noted legal case.

== Life ==
Charlotte Stanton (Goodall) was born in 1766. Her father ran an acting company and that is where she learnt her profession. Her father had bought property in Staffordshire on the profits from his acting company. She was discovered in Bath where she was playing Rosalind by John Palmer. She appeared in several leading parts in Bristol and Bath before appearing again as Rosalind at Drury Lane. She made the newspapers when she argued with Kemble over whether she would appear as "Lady Anne" in King Richard III.

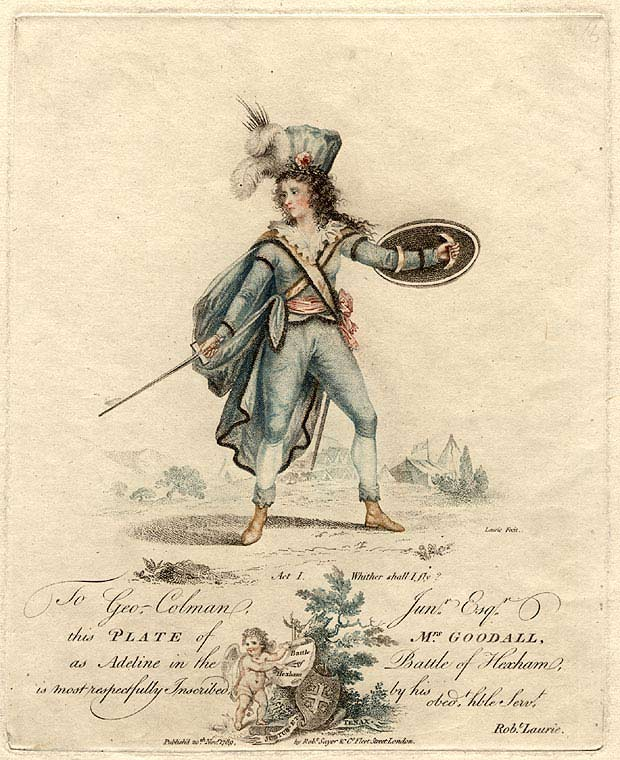
Charlotte Goodall in Breeches Role as Adeline in "Battle of Hexham"

In 1787 she married Thomas Goodall who was a merchant captain. In 1789 she was employed to do breeches parts by George Colman the Younger and she was painted by de Wilde in her costume of Sir Harry Wildair in George Farquhar's The Constant Couple which was later engraved by William Satchwell Leney.

In 1813 her frequently absent husband who was called an "Admiral of Hayti" took out a case for damages against his lawyer, Fletcher. Her husband said he had sent home £120,000 to his lawyer and this had been purloined by his lawyer and moreover he had taken his wife and their six children. The case went to court and although some of the figures may have been exaggerated Goodall was awarded $5,000 for his lawyer's "criminal conversation" with his wife.

The case had been conducted by Sir William Garrow for her husband and oddly a full account of the trial was published in the name of her husband which listed all the major witnesses. The 22-page document also included the love letters sent by the lawyer, Fletcher, to Charlotte.

Goodall died in Somers Town in London in July 1830, shortly before the 19th.
