= Oliver Goodall =

United States Army Air Forces airman (1922–2010)

- Born: May 28, 1922
- Died: October 30, 2010 (aged 88)
- Military career
- Allegiance: United States of America
- Branch: United States Army Air Forces; United States Air Force
- Unit: 477th Bombardment Group
- Conflicts: World War II

Oliver Goodall (May 28, 1922 – October 30, 2010) was an American military aviator who served with the Tuskegee Airmen during World War II. He was involved in the Freeman Field Mutiny, and he was active member in the Tuskegee Airmen, Inc.

== Early life ==
Goodall attended the University of Detroit.

He joined the United States Army Air Force in Pasadena. He did most of his training at Selfridge Field with the rest of the 477th Bombardment Group.

== The mutiny ==
The Freeman Field Mutiny was a culmination of many events that were caused by racism. The first was the switch from the 477th home base to a much smaller and less well-equipped base. The second being the racist commander not allowing blacks and whites to talk to each other, and the third not allowing the black officer into the officer club. This then led to 162 black officers walking into the club and then being arrested. Eventually they were acquitted.

On April 5, 1945 the mutiny occurred. This happened when the last of the troops at Godman were relocated to Freeman. Then when they got there 162 of the black officers walked into the white officers club a few at a time and they were all put under house arrest as they entered. Goodall stated:

"It was unconstitutional, and I wasn't going to take it. We decided to walk into the officers club, and 162 of us were put under house arrest. When the war ended, they wanted to get rid of us, and they started with the troublemakers, which included me."

== See also ==
- B-25 Mitchell
