= Goodall-Woods Law Office =

Historic commercial building in New Hampshire, United States

- U.S. National Register of Historic Places
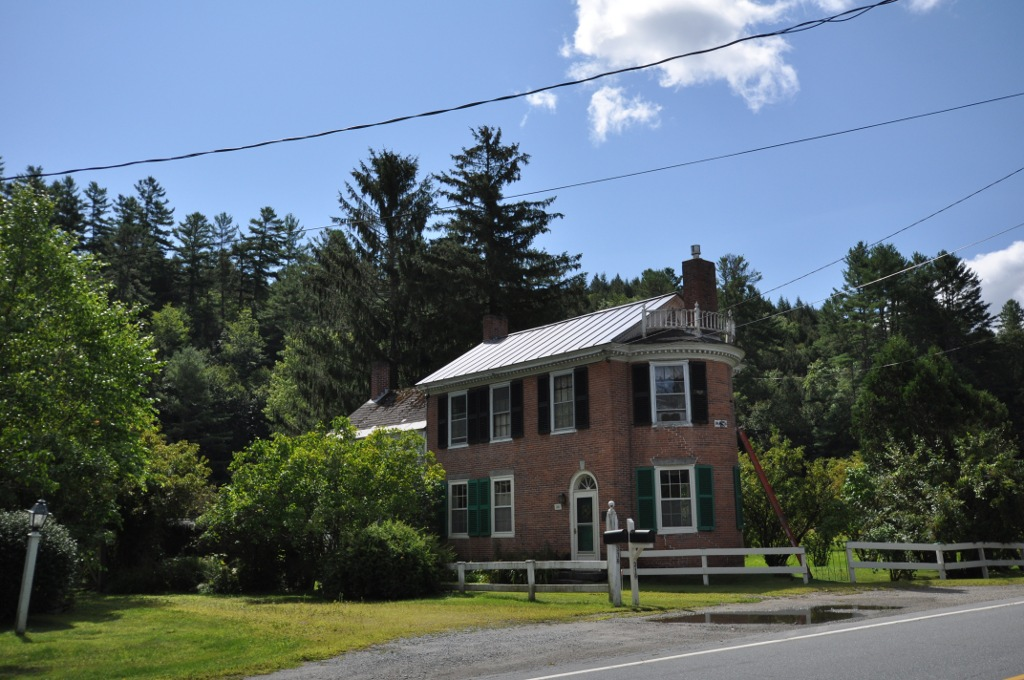

- Location within New Hampshire Location within the United States
- Location: US 302, Bath, New Hampshire
- Coordinates: 44°10′35″N 71°56′40″W
- Area: 1 acre (0.40 ha)
- Built: 1816
- NRHP reference No.: 80000285
- Added to NRHP: August 26, 1980

The Goodall-Woods Law Office is an historic former office building on United States Route 302 in Bath, New Hampshire. The modest two-story brick building, now a private residence, was built in 1816 by Ira Goodall, and is an unusual local example of Federal architecture. It is particularly distinctive for its two-story rounded bay, which projects from the front (street facade). The building was listed on the National Register of Historic Places in 1980.

== Description and history ==
The former Goodall-Woods Law Office building is located in Bath's Upper Village, on the east side of US 302. It is a small 2-1/2 story brick structure, with a gabled roof set perpendicular to the road. Its street facade is a single bay wide, consisting of a rounded projection housing two windows on each floor. It is topped by a semi-conical roof that has a wooden balustrade, and there is a brick chimney sandwiched between the projection and the main block. The main block is three bays deep, with the main entrance in the rightmost bay on the north side, slightly askew from a symmetrical placement. It is topped by a half-round transom window with a granite keystone at the top. Ground-floor windows are set in rectangular openings with stone lintels, while the upper-floor windows are butted against the roof eave at the top.

The structure was built in 1816 by Ira Goodall. At the time of its National Register listing in 1980, most of the distinctive front bay's brickwork and mortar were original, as were the decorative woodwork elements, which were carved to fit its curve. The bricks for the house were locally made, and those for the rounded section were custom-moulded for the purpose.

== See also ==
- National Register of Historic Places listings in Grafton County, New Hampshire
