= Tiny White (equestrian) =

New Zealand horsewoman (1924–2020)

Tiny White OBE
Personal information
- Birth name: Helen Patricia Groome
- Born: 18 April 1924; Hastings, New Zealand
- Died: 10 January 2020 (aged 95); Havelock North, New Zealand
- Spouse: Eric White (m. 1951; died 1980)
- Relative: Tinks Pottinger (daughter)

Sport
- Sport: Equestrian
- Event: Dressage

Helen Patricia "Tiny" White OBE (née Groome; 18 April 1924 – 10 January 2020) was a New Zealand horsewoman, best known as a dressage rider, and the first New Zealander to qualify as a FEI three-day event judge.

== Early life and family ==
Born Helen Patricia Groome in Hastings on 18 April 1924, White was the daughter of Ernest Groome. She was educated at Woodford House from 1936 to 1942, and worked as a land girl on the family farm during World War II. In 1951, she married Eric White, and the couple went on to have three children, including equestrian Tinks Pottinger.

== Equestrianism ==
White won the New Zealand dressage championship on eight occasions. In 1971, she won the Prix St Georges dressage at the Sydney Royal Easter Show, as well as the lady's hack and best lady rider titles, with her horse Rigoletto. Subsequently, she and her husband, Eric, judged hacks and hunters at Sydney, as well as in England, at Hickstead.

White became involved in the sport as an official and administrator, serving on the executive of the Dressage and Pony Club, including a period as chair. She was the first FEI three-day event judge in New Zealand, and was also an FEI dressage judge. In 2006, she became patron of Equestrian Sports New Zealand.

In the 1992 Queen's Birthday Honours, White was appointed an Officer of the Order of the British Empire, for services to equestrian sport.

== Death ==
White died in Havelock North on 10 January 2020.
