= Goodall House (Macon, Georgia) =

Historic house in Georgia, United States

- Formerly listed on the U.S. National Register of Historic Places
- Location within Georgia Location within the United States
- Location: 618 Orange Street, Macon, Georgia
- Coordinates: 32°50′12″N 83°38′19″W
- Area: less than one acre
- Built: 1859
- Architectural style: Italianate
- Demolished: 1975
- NRHP reference No.: 71000255

Significant dates
- Added to NRHP: May 27, 1971
- Removed from NRHP: July 16, 2026

The Goodall House (also known as George D. Collins House) was a historic house located at 618 Orange Street in Macon, Georgia. It was built in 1859 with Italianate exterior and ornate interior. As of 1971, it had been very little altered and it was listed on the National Register of Historic Places. Despite opposition from local preservationists, the house was demolished in 1975 and replaced with an office building.

== Description and history ==
It was listed on the National Register of Historic Places on May 27, 1971. It was deemed significant as a "splendid example of substantial homes built 'on the Hill' as Macon's residential section moved to the higher elevation" from the city's business center. While the house was the first built on its block, by 1971 it was compressed between other houses. One of its few changes since construction was loss of a projecting bay window because an adjacent building was so close.

The nearby Judge Clifford Anderson House, built in the same era, was also outstanding and well-preserved, as of 1971.

In the city directories for Macon, the house is shown as being rented to two or three people in 1972 and 1973, but vacant in 1974. In 1975 the building was slated for demolition, which was opposed by the members of the Middle Georgia Historical Society (MGHS). But that organization did not have resources to rescue the house, and it was replaced by a modern medical office building. This loss spurred the creation of the Macon Heritage Foundation to effect such rescues. (That group eventually merged with MGHS to form the Historic Macon Foundation).
