= Gladys Goodall =

New Zealand photographer (1908–2015)

Gladys Mary Goodall QSM JP (née Bishop, 2 June 1908 – 23 March 2015) was a New Zealand photographer whose work was used for scenic postcards of the country. Her photographs are held in the collection of Museum of New Zealand Te Papa Tongarewa and the National Library of New Zealand.

== Biography ==
Goodall was born on 2 June 1908, the daughter of Frank and Jane Bishop. She was the second eldest of their eight children and grew up on a remote 450-acre hill country farm at Puketi in south Otago. Her parents gave Goodall a Box Brownie camera to experiment with as a child; however due to her rural home there was no photography lab available so Goodall and her mother, a self-taught photographer, set up a darkroom in the farmhouse's scullery and Goodall learnt to develop negatives herself.

Goodall left high school when she was 15 years old and began working in nursing. In 1931 she began training as a nurse, first in Waimate and then in Timaru. As a nurse she specialised in maternity and infant nursing, working at Lewisham Hospital in Christchurch and training as a Plunket Society nurse.

She returned to photography in the 1940s while exploring the Southern Alps of the South Island of New Zealand, using a Rolleiflex camera to capture the scenery, and joining the Canterbury Photography Society in order to learn basic techniques. Originally a freelance black and white photographer, she ran her own photography business in Christchurch from 1952 to 1960. From 1960 to 1980 she had an exclusive contract with Whitcombe & Tombs publishers to provide colour photographs for their calendars and postcards. Her images for Whitcombe & Tombs, which numbered more than 2,000, included cities, towns, notable buildings, airports and aircraft, Māori in traditional garb and seasonal panoramic shots of every part of New Zealand. For this work she used a Linhof Technika camera. Goodall retired from photography in 1980, aged 72.

Goodall's photography is considered an important visual record of New Zealand's landscape as her work covered the length and breadth of the country over a period of more than 30 years. Just under 11,000 colour transparencies and 950 postcards by Goodall are held in the photographic archive of the Alexander Turnbull Library, Wellington.

In the 1992 Queen's Birthday Honours, Goodall was awarded the Queen’s Service Medal for public services. She served as a justice of the peace from 1949 to 1999. Goodall died on 23 March 2015, at the age of 106.

=== Personal life ===
In 1938, Goodall married Stan Goodall, a farmer from the Hakataramea Valley, South Canterbury. They initially lived at Mt. Aitken Station but the farm was uneconomic and they later moved to Christchurch, where her husband became a tour bus driver; Goodall sold her scenic photographs to his passengers as souvenirs.

=== Publications ===
- Goodall, Gladys M. (Gladys Mary) (1964). Wonderland panorama : New Zealand. Whitcombe and Tombs, Christchurch, N.Z
- Goodall, Gladys M. (Gladys Mary) (1971). Bay of Plenty panorama : Whitianga, Whangamata, Mt Maunganui, Tauranga, Whakatane, Ohope, Opotiki, New Zealand. Whitcombe and Tombs, Christchurch [N.Z.]
- Goodall, Gladys M. (Gladys Mary) (1975). Christchurch panorama, New Zealand. Whitcoulls, Christchurch [N.Z.]
