= Hubert Dana Goodale =

Geneticist (1879–1968)

Hubert Dana Goodale (15 June 1879 – 10 June 1968) was an American poultry and cattle geneticist and breeder. He worked at Mount Hope Farm in Williamston, Massachusetts, where he worked on applied genetics and breeding for the poultry and dairy industry. He developed the idea of index breeding for identifying sires in breeding programs. In 1932 he was among the first to use the term "genetic engineering" at the Congress of Genetics in New York.

Goodale was born in Troy, Cheshire to Reverend David Wilder and Mary Lydia née Reed. He went to Trinity College, Connecticut, and then to Columbia University. He received a doctorate in 1913 after working at the Cold Spring Harbor laboratory for two years with studies on the embryology of Spelerpes bislineatus. He then joined the Massachusetts Agricultural Experiment Station as a research professor in the poultry department. He conducted staining experiments with Nile blue sulfate to observe cell fates in the developing amphibian embryo in 1911. In 1922 he moved to Mount Hope Farm, owned by Colonel Ezra Parmalee Prentice (1863–1955) and his wife, Alta Rockefeller Prentice, who was a daughter of John D. Rockefeller. Here Goodale conducted experiments until his retirement. He introduced what is now called index breeding, where not only pedigree was examined when breeding but also the testing of progeny. He was able to improve the yields of eggs in hens and introduced techniques for the selection of bulls for breeding high milk-yielding cattle. The sire index that he developed was termed the "Mount Hope Index".

Goodale conducted experiments on sex hormones by transplanting ovaries into castrated male chickens. He also looked at sex-linked characters and the genetics of poultry. He also examined the limits to quantitative trait improvement. Unlike most other experimenters, he believed that there were few limits. He also maintained mice for experiments. Through repeated crossing, he was able to breed mice with a lot of white facial hair.

Goodale married Lottie E. Merrill in 1906, and they had two daughters. He was a member of the American Society of Zoologists from 1914 and the Poultry Science Association.
