= John Strickland Goodall =

British writer, watercolour painter and illustrator

John Strickland Goodall RBA RI (7 June 1908 – 2 June 1996) was a British writer, watercolour painter and illustrator, best known for his wordless picture books such as The Adventures of Paddy Pork, although his output included more conventional pictures, and illustrations for a wide range of publications (including the Radio Times) and books set in villages by the author Dora Saint, who wrote under the pen name of Miss Read". Goodall became one of England's most beloved artists due to the subject matter of his works, the Victorian and Edwardian eras.

"Victorians Abroad" watercolour

== Life ==
Goodall was born in Heacham, Norfolk on 7 June 1908, the son of Joseph Strickland Goodall, an eminent cardiologist, and his wife, Amelia Hunt. He came from a long line of doctors. He attended Harrow School. His father permitted him to leave academia and instead train as an artist under two family friends: Sir Arthur Stockdale Cope and John Watson Nicol. From 1925 to 1929 he attended the Royal Academy of Arts. He married Margaret Nicol in 1933.

During the Second World War he worked as a camouflage artist, based in India. He had his first public exhibition of paintings in the Government School of Art in Calcutta in 1943. After the war he settled in Tisbury, Wiltshire where he shared an idyllic cottage with his wife. The house featured in many of his paintings.

He died in Shaftesbury on 2 June 1996.

A self-portrait created during the Second World War is held by the National Portrait Gallery, London.

== Children's books ==
- The Adventures of Paddy Pork (1968), winner of the Boston Globe-Horn Book Award in 1969
- Shrewbettina's Birthday (1971)
- The Midnight Adventures of Kelly, Dot, and Esmeralda (1972)
- Creepy Castle (1975)
- Naughty Nancy (1975)
- Jacko (1976)
- The Surprise Picnic (1977)
- Lavinia's Cottage (1982)
- Paddy Goes Travelling (1982)

== General books ==
- An Edwardian Summer (1976)
- An Edwardian Christmas (1977)
- The Story of an English Village (1978)
- An Edwardian Diary for 1979 (1978)
- An Edwardian Season (1980)
- Before the War 1908-1939 (1981)
- Edwardian Entertainments (1982)
- Above and Below Stairs (1983)
- An Edwardian Holiday (1983)
- Victorians Abroad (1983)
- The Story of a Castle (1986)
- The Story of a Main Street (1987)
- The Story of a High Street (1987)
- The Story of a Farm (1989)
- The Story of the Seashore (1990)
- Great Days of a Country House (1991)
- John S. Goodall's Album (1994)
