= Thomas Goodall House =

Historic house in Maine, United States

- U.S. National Register of Historic Places
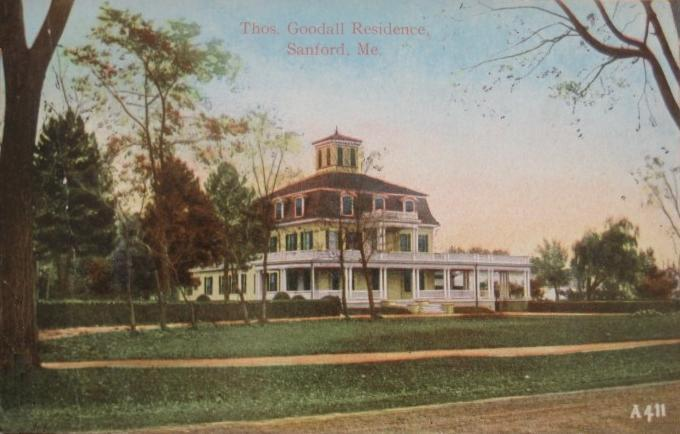
- Postcard view, 1910

- Location within Maine Location within the United States
- Location: near 938 Main St., Sanford, Maine
- Coordinates: 43°26′15″N 70°46′24″W
- Area: 2 acres (0.81 ha)
- Built: 1871
- Architectural style: Colonial Revival, Second Empire
- NRHP reference No.: 75000207
- Added to NRHP: April 28, 1975

The Thomas Goodall House is a historic house near 938 Main Street in Sanford, Maine. It was built in 1871 for Thomas Goodall, owner of the local Goodall Mill, one of the region's largest employers in the late 19th century. Retaining many Second Empire details from its original construction, it underwent significant Colonial Revival alterations by Goodall's son, Eugene, early in the 20th century. The house was listed on the National Register of Historic Places in 1975.

== Description and history ==
The Goodall House is located on the east side of Main Street (Maine State Route 109) just south of Sanford center, and just north of the Louis B. Goodall Memorial Library. The main block is roughly square in shape, two stories in height, with a mansard roof topped by a square cupola. A single-story porch wraps around three sides of the house, extending to the right to include a porte-cochere. The porch is supported by grouped round columns, with elaborate balustrades below and above. A glassed-in porch stands at the second level above the entrance. The dormers in the mansard roof are topped by segmented arches, having been stripped of their original Second Empire woodwork.

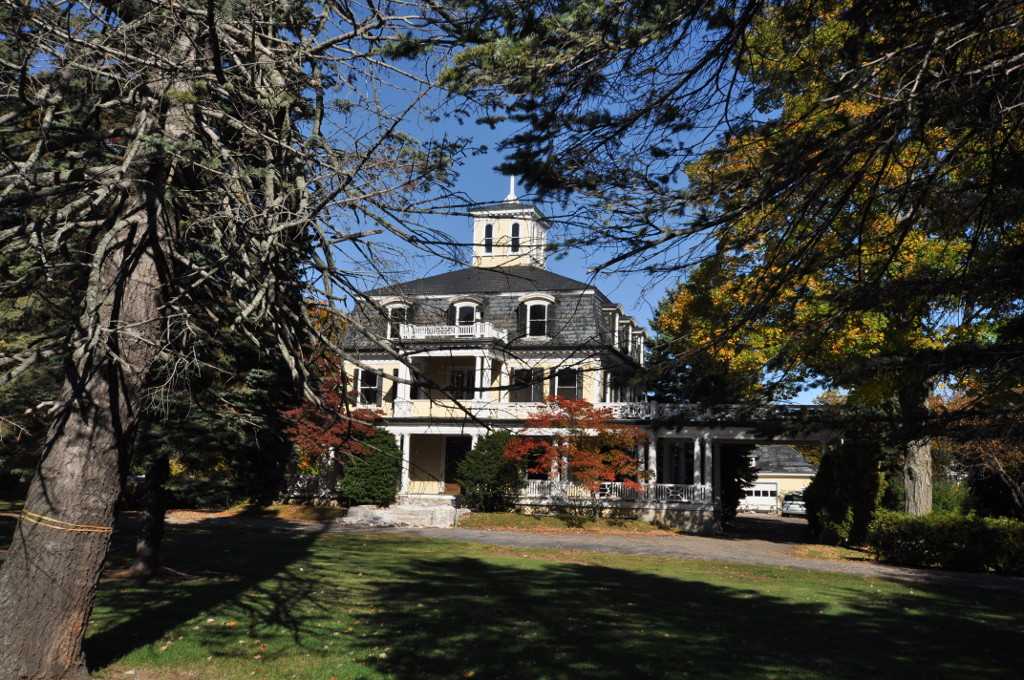
The house in 2015

The house was built in 1871 by Thomas Goodall, an Englishman who made his fortune in American textile business, and was then owner of the Goodall Mill in Sanford. At the time of this house's construction, the mill was a relatively small operation, but by the turn of the 20th century it was the area's largest employer, with a payroll of about 1,000. The house originally had more elaborate Second Empire styling, including projecting window bays and an entry portico; these were removed by Goodall's son Eugene, the house's next owner, who replace many of those features with the existing Colonial Revival treatment.

== See also ==
- National Register of Historic Places listings in York County, Maine
