= Harry Goodall =

English cricketer

Personal information
- Full name: Harry Hornby Goodall
- Born: 17 January 1877; Nottingham, Nottinghamshire, England
- Died: 20 February 1961 (aged 84); Beeston, Nottinghamshire, England
- Batting: Right-handed

Domestic team information
- Years: Team
- 1902–1905: Nottinghamshire

Career statistics
Competition	First-class
Matches	5
Runs scored	92
Batting average	15.33
100s/50s	–/–
Top score	26
Balls bowled	–
Wickets	–
Bowling average	–
5 wickets in innings	–
10 wickets in match	–
Best bowling	–
Catches/stumpings	1/–
- Source: Cricinfo, 20 May 2012

Harry Hornby Goodall (17 January 1877 – 20 February 1961) was an English cricketer. Goodall was a right-handed batsman. He was born at Nottingham, Nottinghamshire.

Goodall made his first-class debut for Nottinghamshire against Leicestershire in the 1902 County Championship. He played a further fixture in that season against Essex. He next played first-class cricket for the county in the 1905 County Championship, making three appearances against Essex, Middlesex and Derbyshire. In his total of five first-class appearances for the county, he scored a total of 92 runs at an average of 15.33, with a high score of 26.

He died at Beeston, Nottinghamshire, on 20 February 1961.
