= Goodall Building =

- U.S. National Register of Historic Places
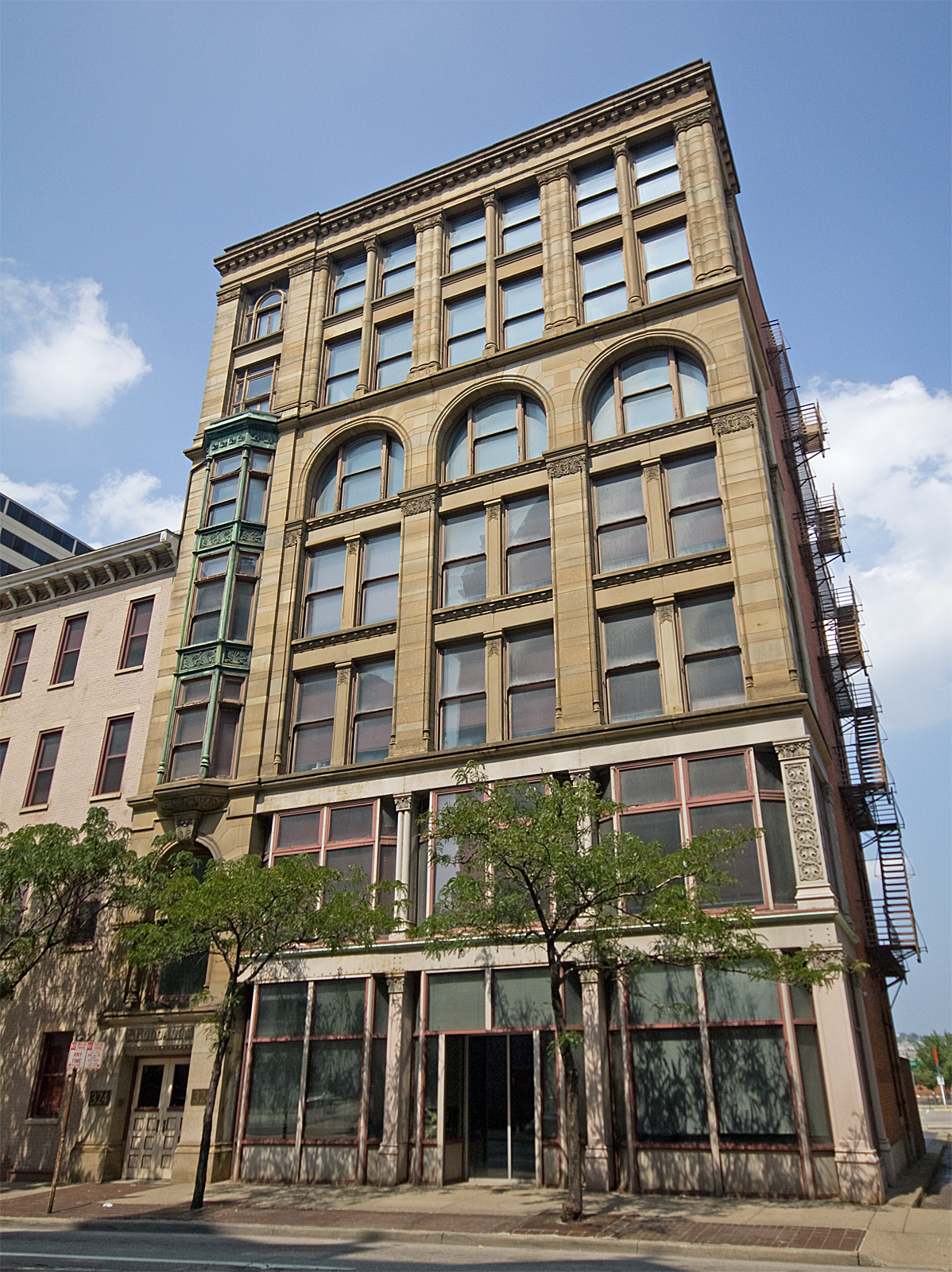
- Front of the Goodall Building

- Location within Ohio Location within the United States
- Location: 324 W. 9th St., Cincinnati, Ohio
- Coordinates: 39°6′16.1″N 84°31′12″W
- Area: less than one acre
- Built: 1893
- Architect: George W. Rapp
- Architectural style: Second Renaissance Revival
- NRHP reference No.: 84003710
- Added to NRHP: February 9, 1984

The Goodall Building is a historic commercial building in Cincinnati, Ohio, United States. Located on Ninth Street in the northwestern portion of the city's downtown, it was designed by George W. Rapp and erected in 1893. The building's walls are constructed primarily of brick and sandstone, although elements of iron and of other kinds of stone are also manifested on the exterior.

The building's first owner, William Goodall, was a dealer of stone objects, selling blocks of granite and marble for various purposes. Both before and after arranging for the present structure's construction with Rapp, a leading city architect, he occupied premises nearby. Rather than using his new structure for his own business, he rented it to others; among his tenants were banks and various corporate offices. In 1894 the Cincinnati Theosophical Society occupied “the entire seventh floor of the new Goodall Building on Ninth Street opposite the new City Hall.”

The Goodall Building is distinguished from surrounding structures by its many Second Renaissance Revival architectural elements. Such stone details as prominent columns and pilasters, a cornice with many articulations, and large blocks of sandstone, combined with the building's oriel windows, have led architectural historians to see it as one of Cincinnati's best examples of commercial Second Renaissance Revival architecture. In recognition of its well-preserved historic architecture, the Goodall Building was listed on the National Register of Historic Places in early 1984.
