= 1846 in art =

Events from the year 1846 in art.

== Events ==
- 4 May – The Royal Academy Exhibition of 1846 opens at the National Gallery in London
- Edward Lear publishes Illustrated Excursions to Italy and is made Drawing Master to Queen Victoria.
- The Wellington Statue by Matthew Cotes Wyatt is erected at its original location in London's Hyde Park Corner.

== Works ==
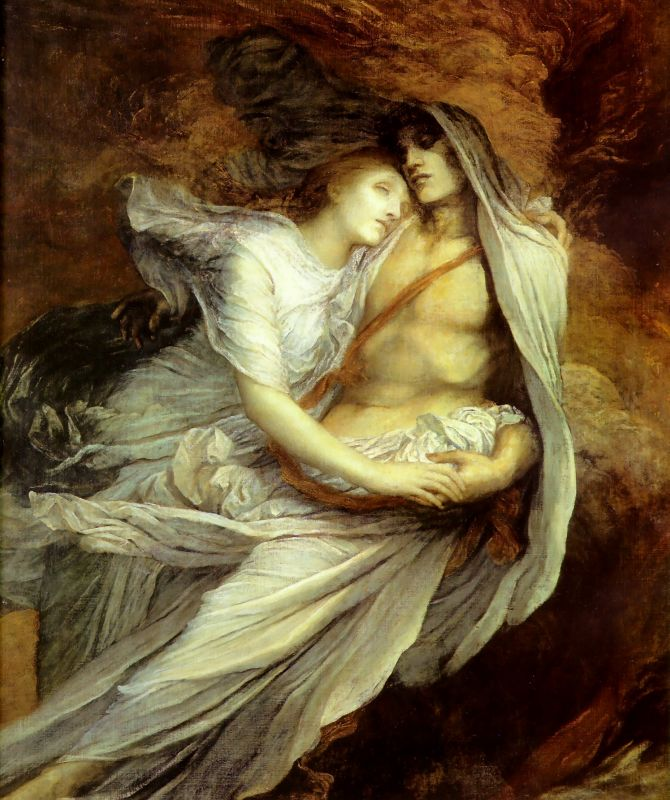
G. F. Watts – Paolo and Francesca

- Ivan Aivazovsky – Battle of Navarino
- Thomas Cole – Catskill Landscape
- William Etty – Musidora: The Bather 'At the Doubtful Breeze Alarmed' (Tate Britain version)
- Jean-Léon Gérôme – Young Greeks at a Cockfight
- John Hayes – Portrait of Agnes Strickland
- Louis Hersent – Portrait of Delphine Gay
- Edward Hicks – Noah's Ark
- Emanuel Leutze – The Courtship of Anne Boleyn
- John Everett Millais – Pizarro Seizing the Inca of Peru (Tate Britain)
- Jean-François Millet – Prometheus Unbound
- Rembrandt Peale – Self-portrait
- Henry William Pickersgill – Portrait of Robert Vernon
- David Roberts – A Street in Cairo
- Eliseo Sala – Pia de' Tolomei
- Henri Frédéric Schopin – The Divorce of the Empress Josephine
- Clarkson Stanfield
  - The Battle of Roveredo
  - On the Dogger Bank
  - The Royal Yacht Passing St Michael's Mount
- Giovanni Strazza – Ishmael Abandoned in the Desert (completed).
- J.M.W. Turner
  - Queen Mab's Cave
  - Whalers Entangled in Flaw Ice
- Horace Vernet – Louis Philippe and His Sons
- Peter von Hess – The Battle of Smolensk
- Edward Matthew Ward
  - The Disgrace of Lord Clarendon
  - Portrait of Daniel Maclise
- George Frederic Watts – Paolo and Francesca
- Franz Xaver Winterhalter – Portrait of Edward, Prince of Wales

== Births ==
- March 17 – Kate Greenaway, English illustrator (died 1901)
- May 3 – Sir Edmund Elton, 8th Baronet, English studio potter (died 1920)
- May 21 – Luc-Olivier Merson, French painter (died 1920)
- October 14 – Albert Schickedanz, Austro-Hungarian architect and painter in the Eclectic style (died 1915)
- October 28 – Albert Dubois-Pillet, French Neo-impressionist painter (died 1890)
- November 3 – Elizabeth Thompson, British painter (died 1933)
- December 9 – John Macallan Swan, English painter and sculptor (died 1910)

== Deaths ==
- January 22 – Louis-Pierre Baltard, French architect and engraver (born 1764)
- April 16 – Christian Duttenhofer, German engraver (born 1778)
- June 8 – Rodolphe Töpffer, Swiss painter and cartoonist (born 1799)
- June 22 – Benjamin Haydon, English historical painter and writer (born 1786; suicide)
- July 16 – Vasily Demut-Malinovsky, Russian sculptor in the Empire style (born 1779)
- August 11 – Bartolomé Montalvo, Spanish painter specializing in landscapes, hunted animals and still lifes (born 1769)
- August 12 – John Caspar Wild, Swiss-born American landscape painter and lithographer (born 1804)
- October 5 – Henri van der Haert, Belgian portrait painter, sculptor, illustrator and engraver (born 1790)
- December 12 – Charles Alexandre Lesueur, French artist and explorer (born 1778)
- date unknown – Pál Balkay, Hungarian painter and teacher (born 1785)
