= Pizarro Seizing the Inca of Peru =

Painting by John Everett Millais

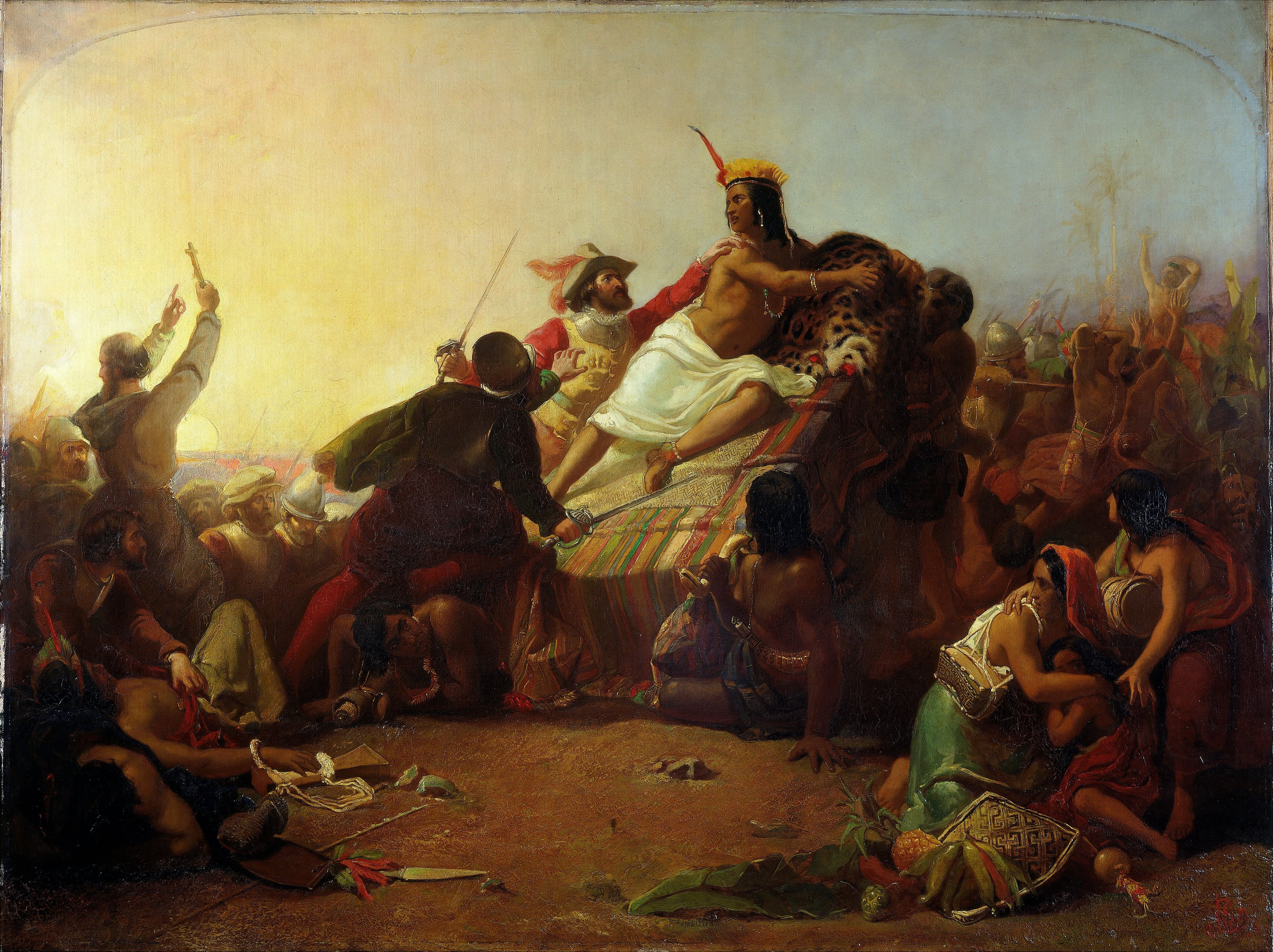
- Artist: John Everett Millais
- Year: 1846
- Type: Oil on canvas, history painting
- Dimensions: 128.3 cm × 171.7 cm (50.5 in × 67.6 in)
- Location: Victoria and Albert Museum, London

Pizarro Seizing the Inca of Peru is an oil on canvas history painting by the English artist John Everett Millais, from 1846. It is held the Victoria and Albert Museum, in London, having been acquired in 1897.

== History and description ==
Millais was sixteen when he produced the work, which depicts the seizure of Atahualpa, the Incan Emperor, by the Spanish conquistador Francisco Pizarro in 1532. As his model for Pizarro, Millais used the actor Henry John Wallack who had notably played him in Richard Brinsley Sheridan's 1799 play Pizarro.

It was exhibited at the Royal Academy's Summer Exhibition of 1846. His first work exhibited there, it was praised by critics despite its poor location in the exhibition. Soon afterwards Millais joined the Pre-Raphaelite Brotherhood.

== See also ==
- List of paintings by John Everett Millais
- The First Interview Between the Spaniards and the Peruvians, an 1827 painting of the subject by Henry Perronet Briggs

== Bibliography ==
- Covey, R. Alan. Inca Apocalypse: The Spanish Conquest and the Transformation of the Andean World. Oxford University Press, 2020.
- Newall, Christopher. Pre-Raphaelites: Beauty and Rebellion. Liverpool University Press, 2016.
- Sizeranne, Robert The Pre-Raphaelites. Parkstone International, 2023.
