= Choosing the Wedding Gown =

Painting by William Mulready

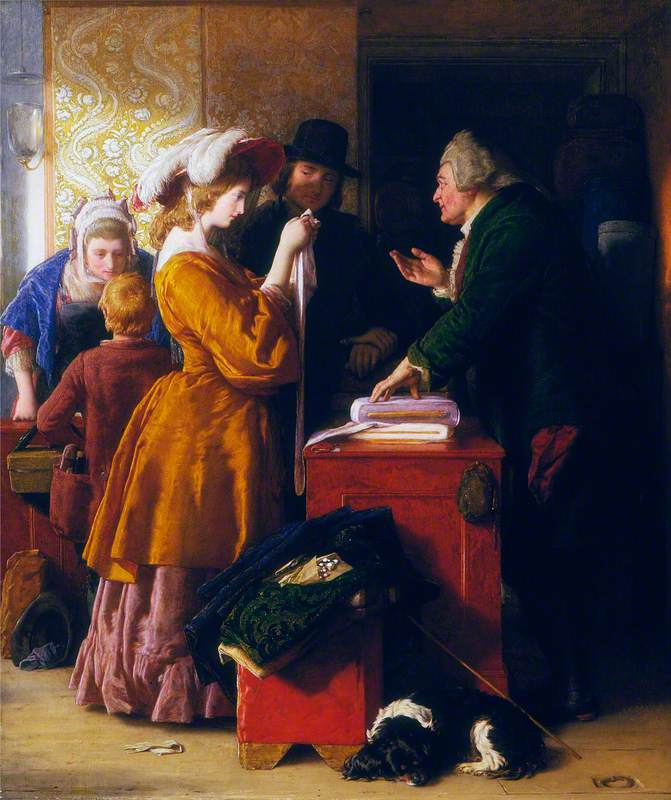
- Artist: William Mulready
- Year: 1845
- Type: Oil on panel, genre painting
- Dimensions: 52.9 cm × 44.7 cm (20.8 in × 17.6 in)
- Location: Victoria and Albert Museum, London

Choosing the Wedding Gown is an oil on panel genre painting by the Irish artist William Mulready, from 1845. It illustrates a scene from Oliver Goldsmith's novel The Vicar of Wakefield. Mulready originally created the image as a frontispiece for an 1843 edition of the novel.

Such pictures based on popular literature were popular in the early Victorian era. The painting was displayed at the Royal Academy Exhibition of 1846 at the National Gallery where it was considered one of the major highlights. Today it is in the Victoria and Albert Museum having been donated as part of the Sheepshanks Gift by the art collector John Sheepshanks in 1857.

== Bibliography ==
- Herrmann, Luke. Nineteenth Century British Painting. Charles de la Mare, 2000.
- Moran, Maureen. Victorian Literature and Culture. Bloomsbury Publishing, 2006
- Roe, Sonia. Oil Paintings in Public Ownership in the Victoria and Albert Museum. Public Catalogue Foundation, 2008.
- Wright, Christopher, Gordon, Catherine May & Smith, Mary Peskett. British and Irish Paintings in Public Collections: An Index of British and Irish Oil Paintings by Artists Born Before 1870 in Public and Institutional Collections in the United Kingdom and Ireland. Yale University Press, 2006.
