= Whalers Entangled in Flaw Ice =

Painting by J. M. W. Turner

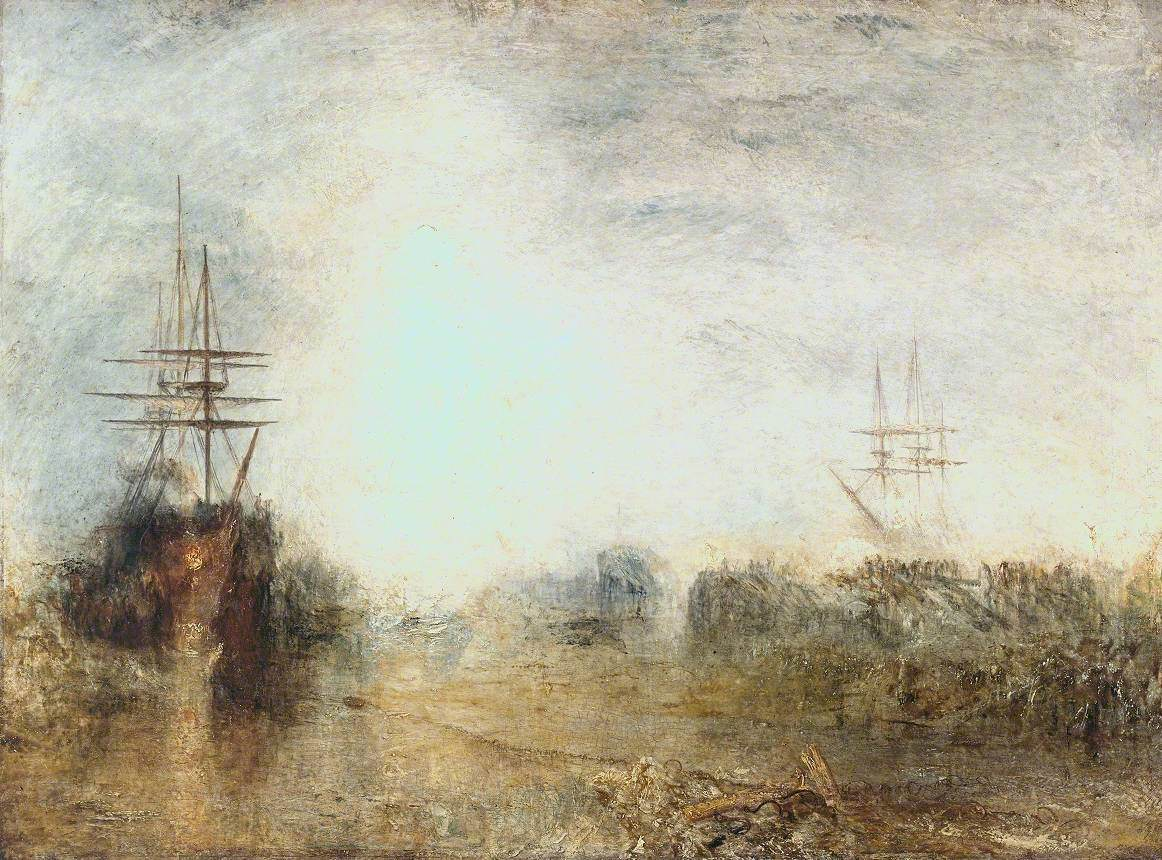
- Artist: J. M. W. Turner
- Year: 1846
- Type: Oil on canvas, seascape painting
- Dimensions: 89.9 cm × 120 cm (35.4 in × 47 in)
- Location: Tate Britain, London

Whalers Entangled in Flaw Ice is an 1846 oil painting by the British artist J.M.W. Turner. A seascape, it features a view of a whaling ship caught in ice while in the process of boiling blubber. Turner drew inspiration from Thomas Beale's book Natural History of the Sperm Whale.

The painting was displayed at the Royal Academy Exhibition of 1846 at the National Gallery in London under the longer title Whalers (Boiling Blubber) Entangled in Flaw Ice, Endeavouring to Extricate Themselves. Turner also exhibited another whaling picture Hurrah! for the Whaler Erebus! Another Fish!.

Turner produced four whaling-themed pictures in the middle of the decade the hope that they would all be purchased by the art collector Elhanan Bicknell who had made his fortune through the whaling industry, but was disappointed. This and three other of the paintings formed part of the Turner Bequest of 1856 and are now in the Tate Britain in Pimlico.

== See also ==
- List of paintings by J. M. W. Turner

== Bibliography ==
- Bailey, Anthony. J.M.W. Turner: Standing in the Sun. Tate Enterprises, 2013
- Edwards, Jason. Turner and the Whale. Bloomsbury Publishing, 2017.
- Hokanson, Alison. Turner's Whaling Pictures. Metropolitan Museum of Art, 2016.
