= Royal Academy Exhibition of 1846 =

1846 art exhibition in London

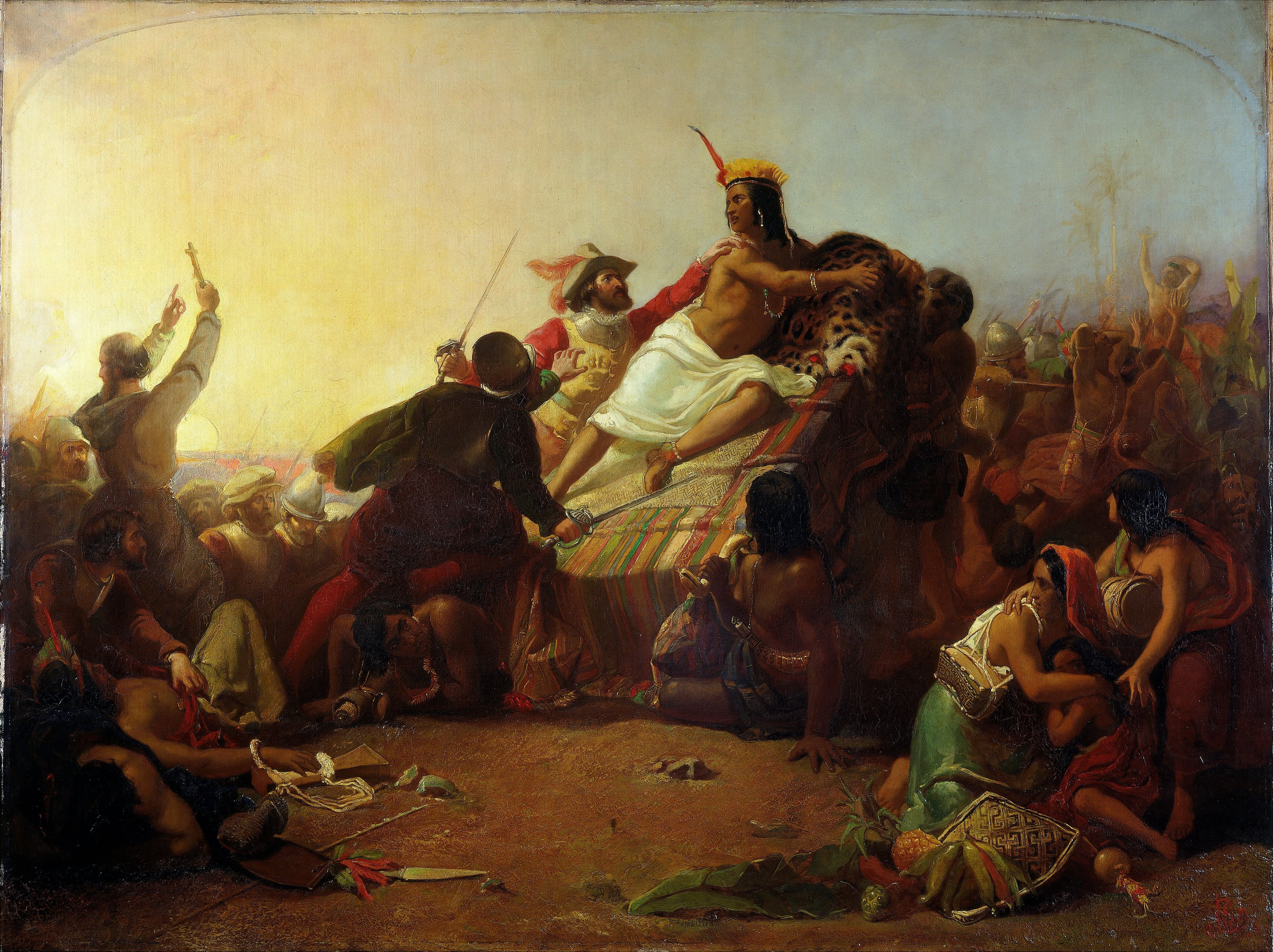
Pizarro Seizing the Inca of Peru by John Everett Millais

The Royal Academy Exhibition of 1846 was the seventy eighth annual Summer Exhibition held by the British Royal Academy of Arts. It took place between 4 May and 25 July 1846 at the National Gallery in London. Including submissions by leading artists and architects, it featured both those who had made their name in the Regency era and younger figures of the Victorian era.

The veteran painter J.M.W. Turner submitted a number of works. Going to the Ball and Returning from the Ball were inspired by his repeated visits to Venice. Hurrah for the Whaler Erebus and Whalers Entangled in Flaw Ice were apparent attempts to court the interest of the art collector Elhanan Bicknell who had made his fortune through the whaling industry.

One of the most popular paintings on display was William Mulready's Choosing the Wedding Gown based on Oliver Goldsmith's novel The Vicar of Wakefield. A member of The Clique Edward Matthew Ward sent in the history painting The Disgrace of Lord Clarendon. The sixteen year old John Everett Millais made his exhibition debut with Pizarro Seizing the Inca of Peru. He later became a member of the Pre-Raphaelite Brotherhood.

Edwin Landseer displayed two companion paintings Time of Peace and Time of War. Widely praised at the time, both were subsequently destroyed during the Thames Flood of 1928.

In portraiture Francis Grant presented equestrian portraits of Queen Victoria and her husband Prince Albert. The French artist Alfred d'Orsay submitted a picture of the Duke of Wellington.

== Gallery ==
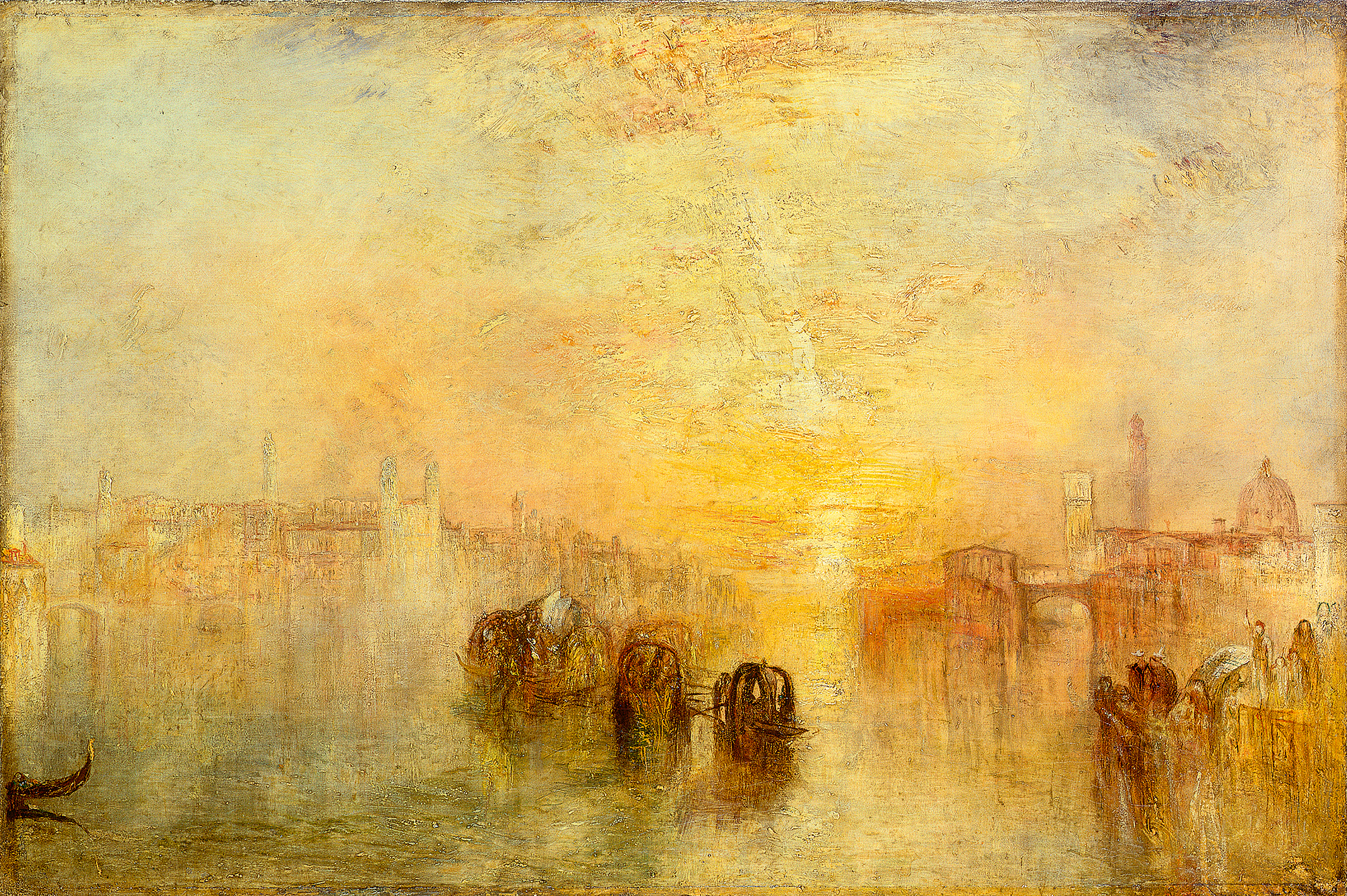
Going to the Ball by J.M.W. Turner

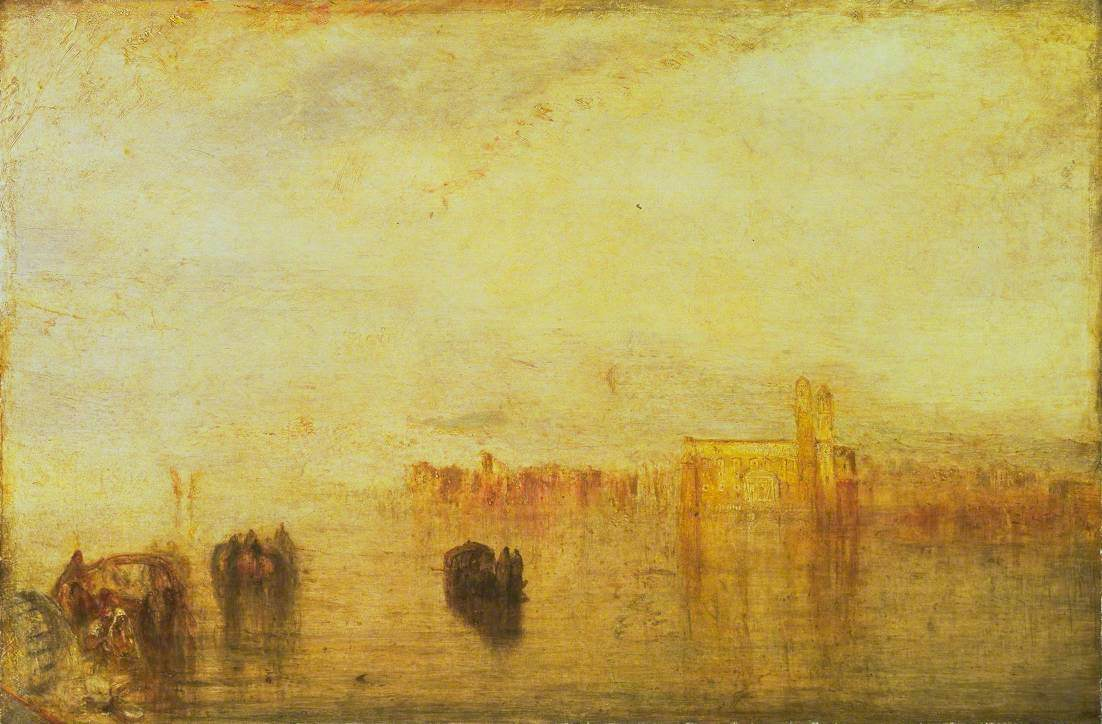
Returning from the Ball by J.M.W. Turner

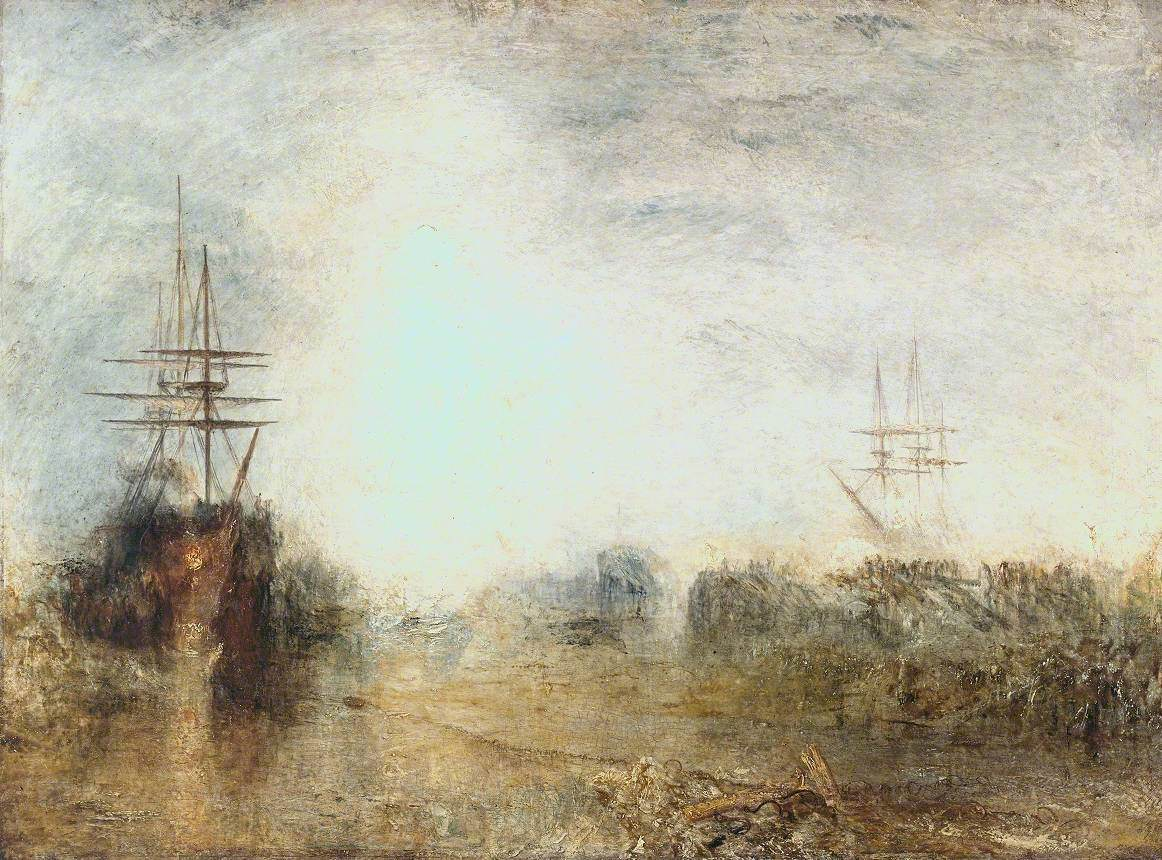
Whalers Entangled in Flaw Ice by J.M.W. Turner

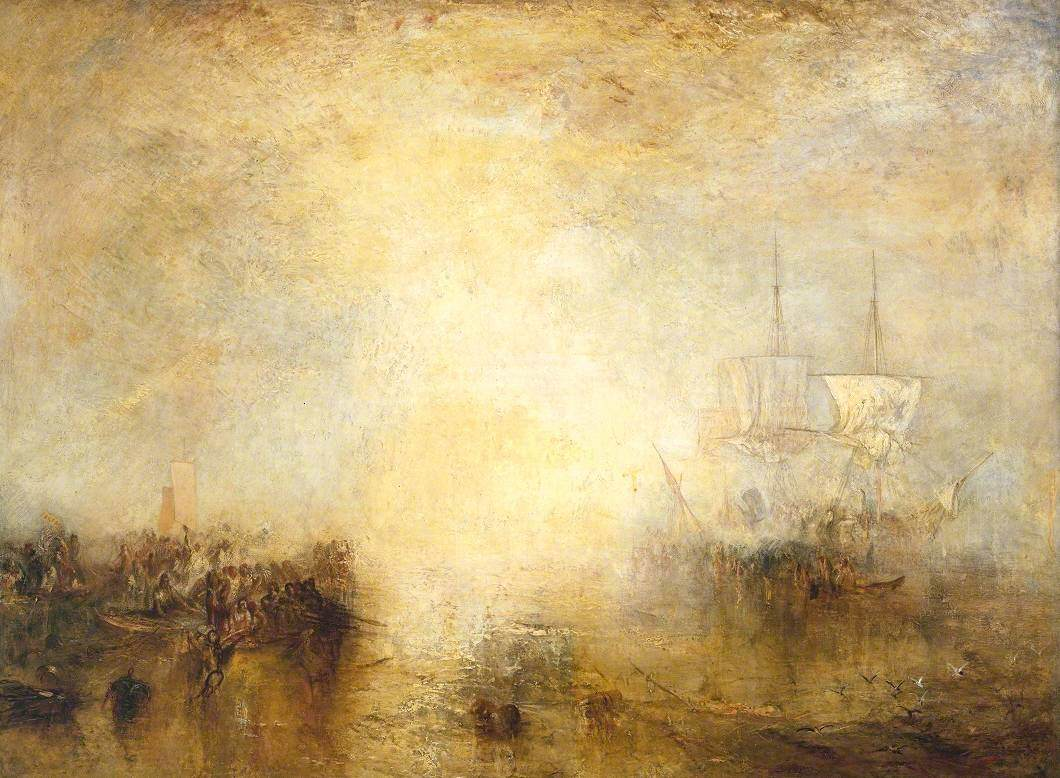
Hurrah for the Whaler Erebus by J.M.W. Turner

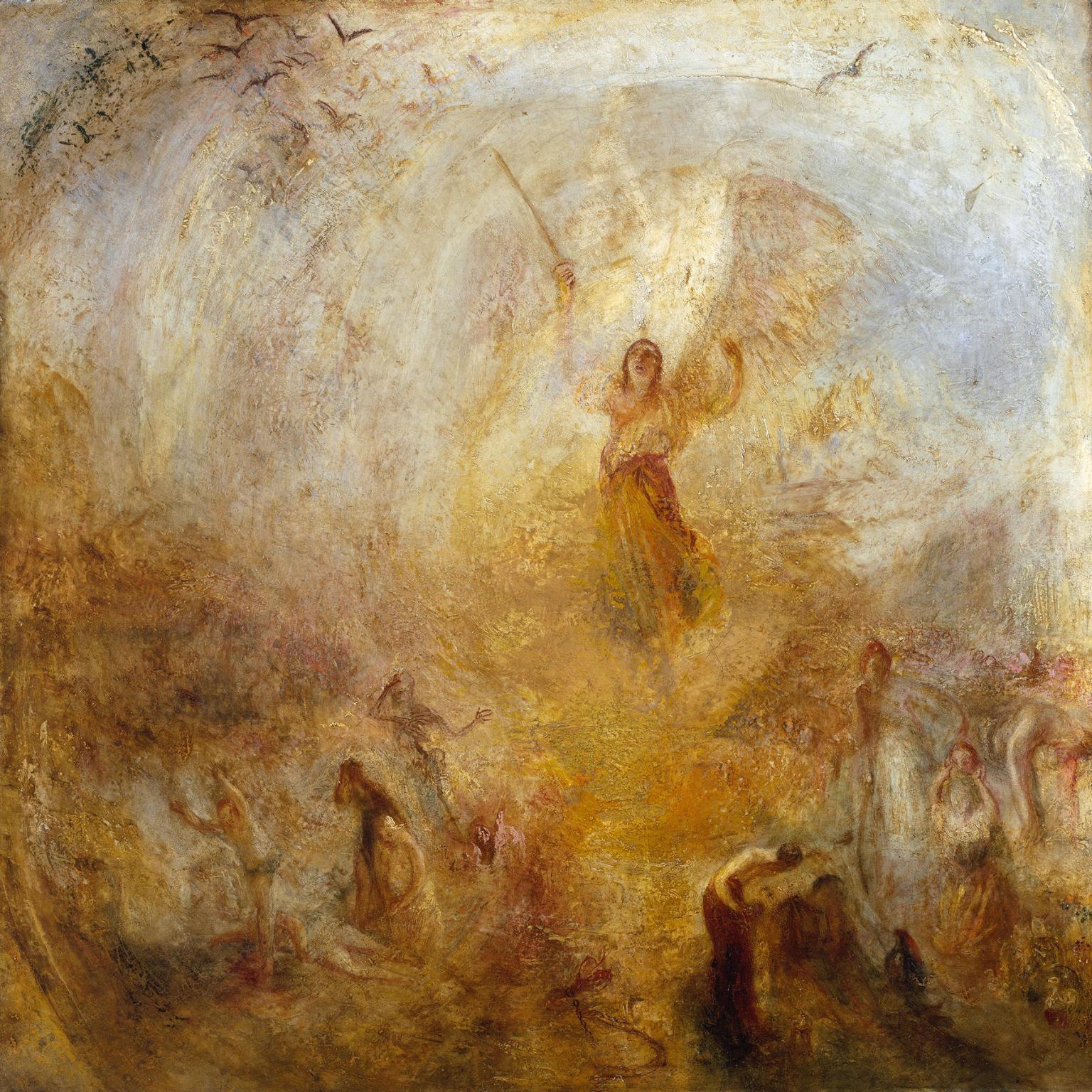
The Angel Standing in the Sun by J.M.W. Turner

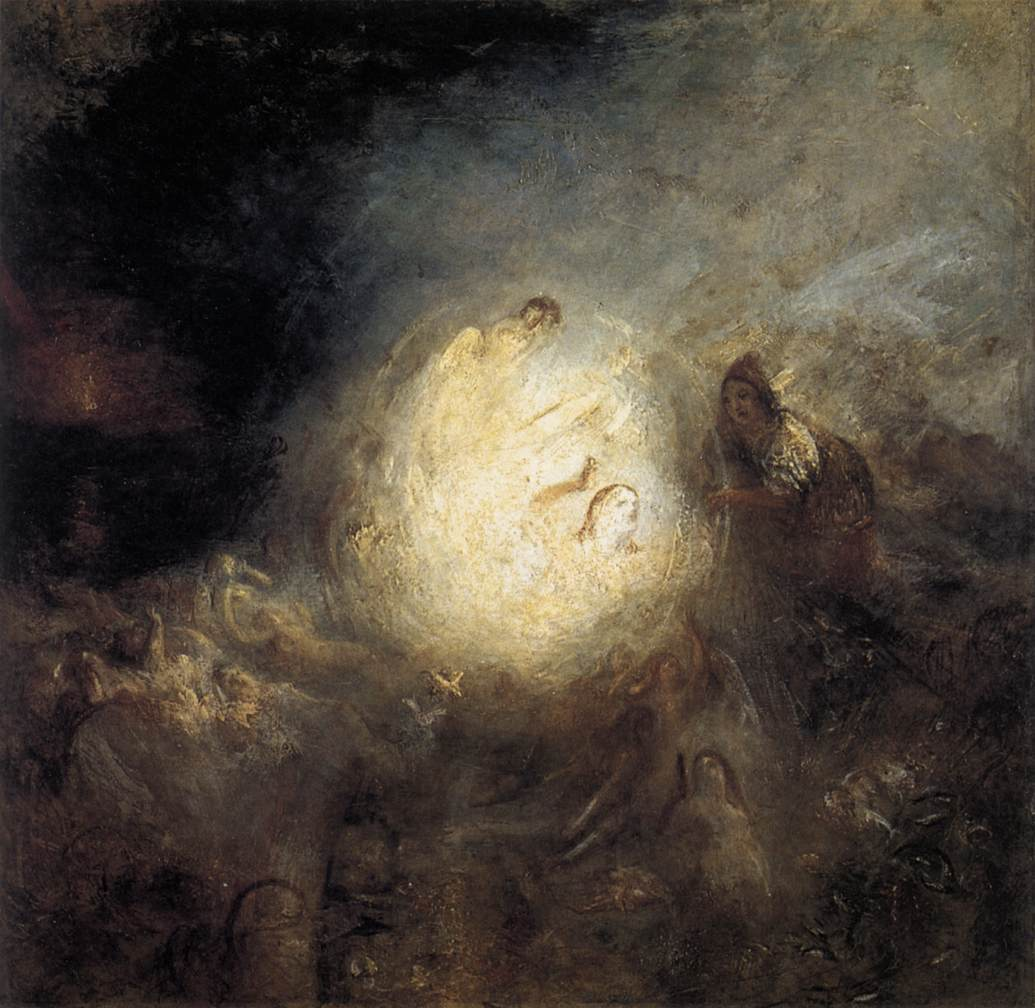
Undine Giving the Ring to Massaniello, Fisherman of Naples by J.M.W. Turner

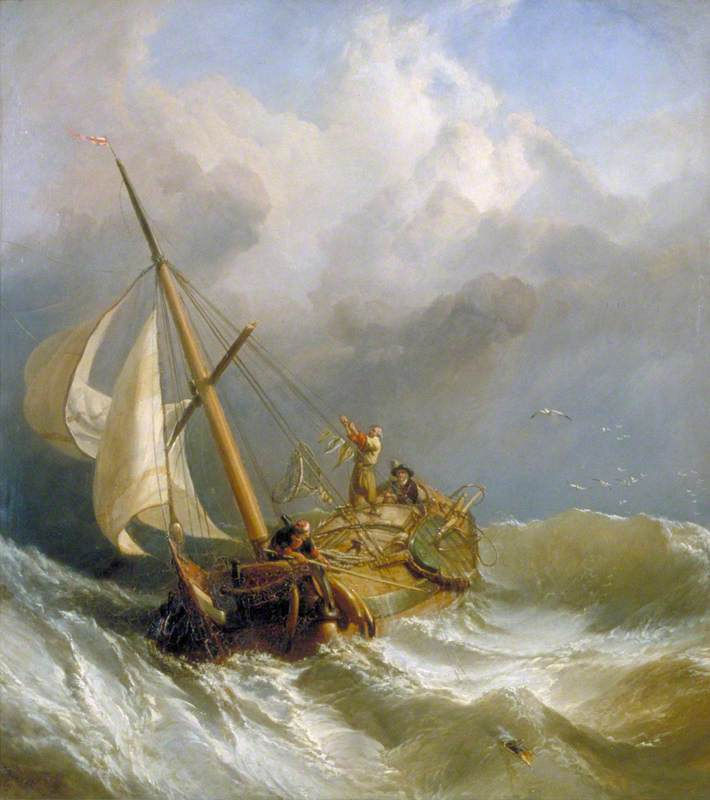
On the Dogger Bank by Clarkson Stanfield

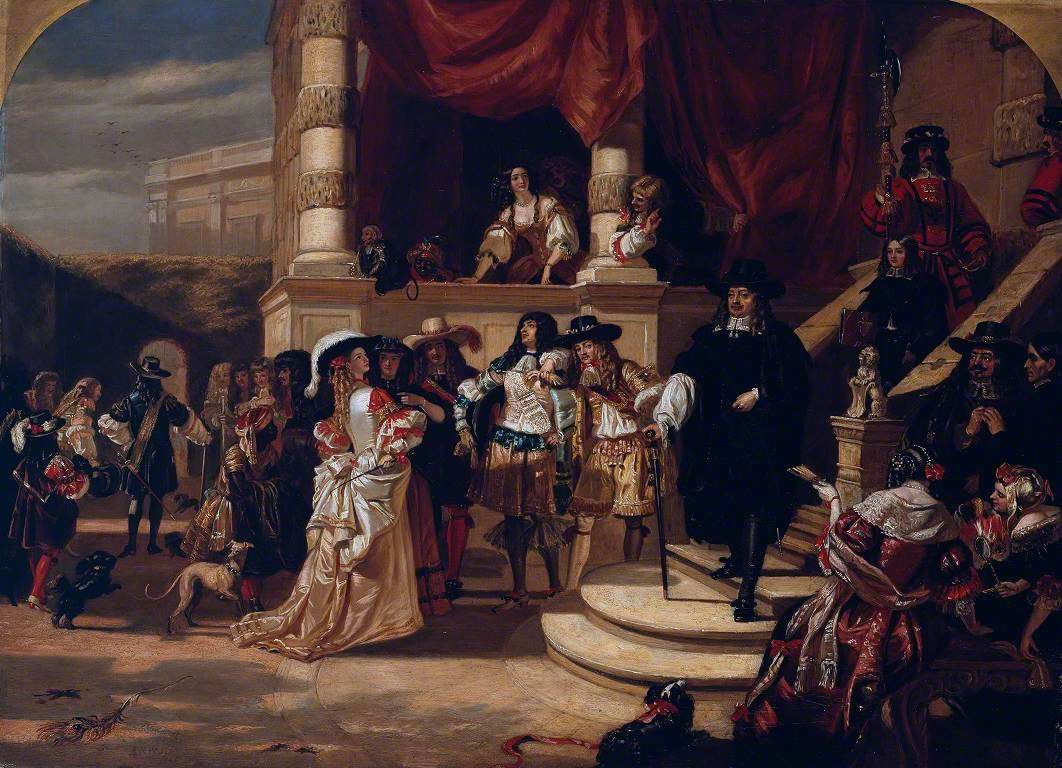
The Disgrace of Lord Clarendon by Edward Matthew Ward

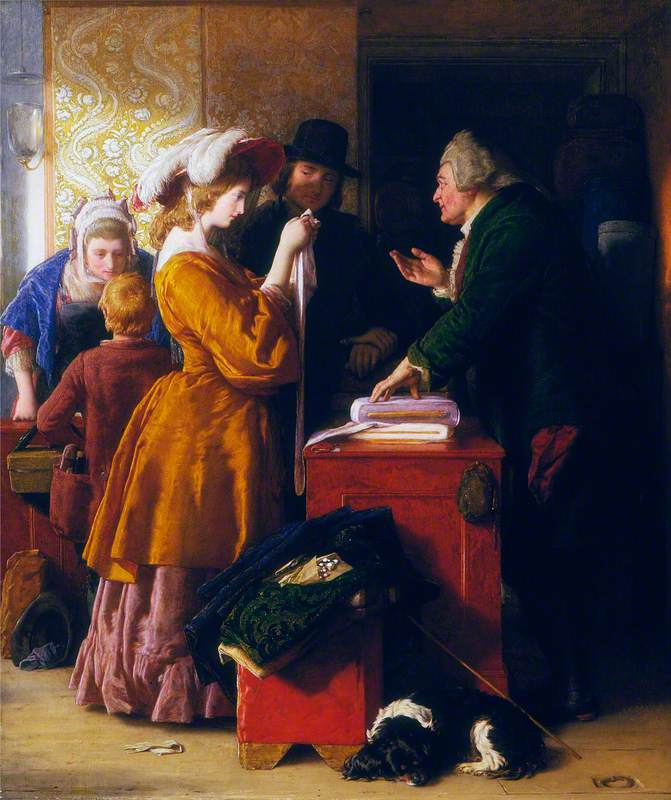
Choosing the Wedding Gown by William Mulready

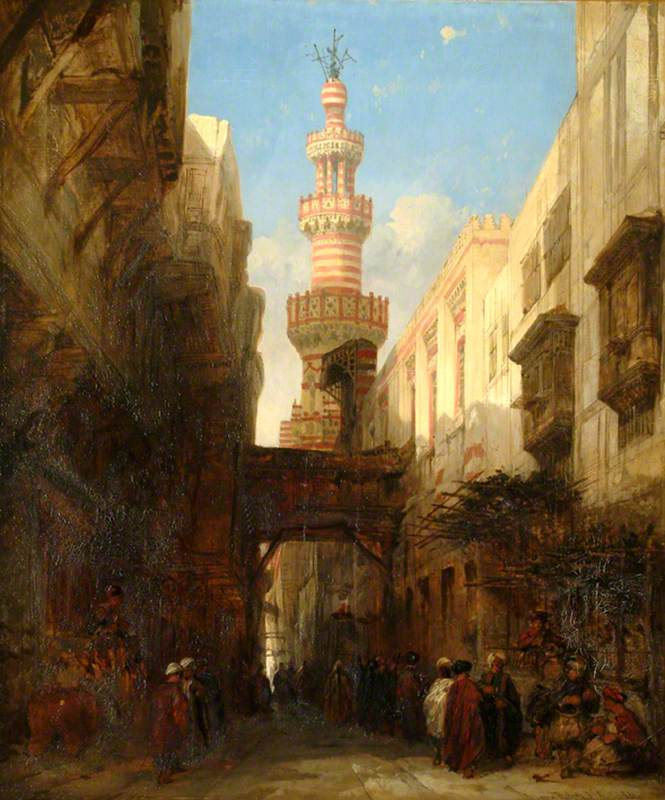
A Street in Cairo by David Roberts

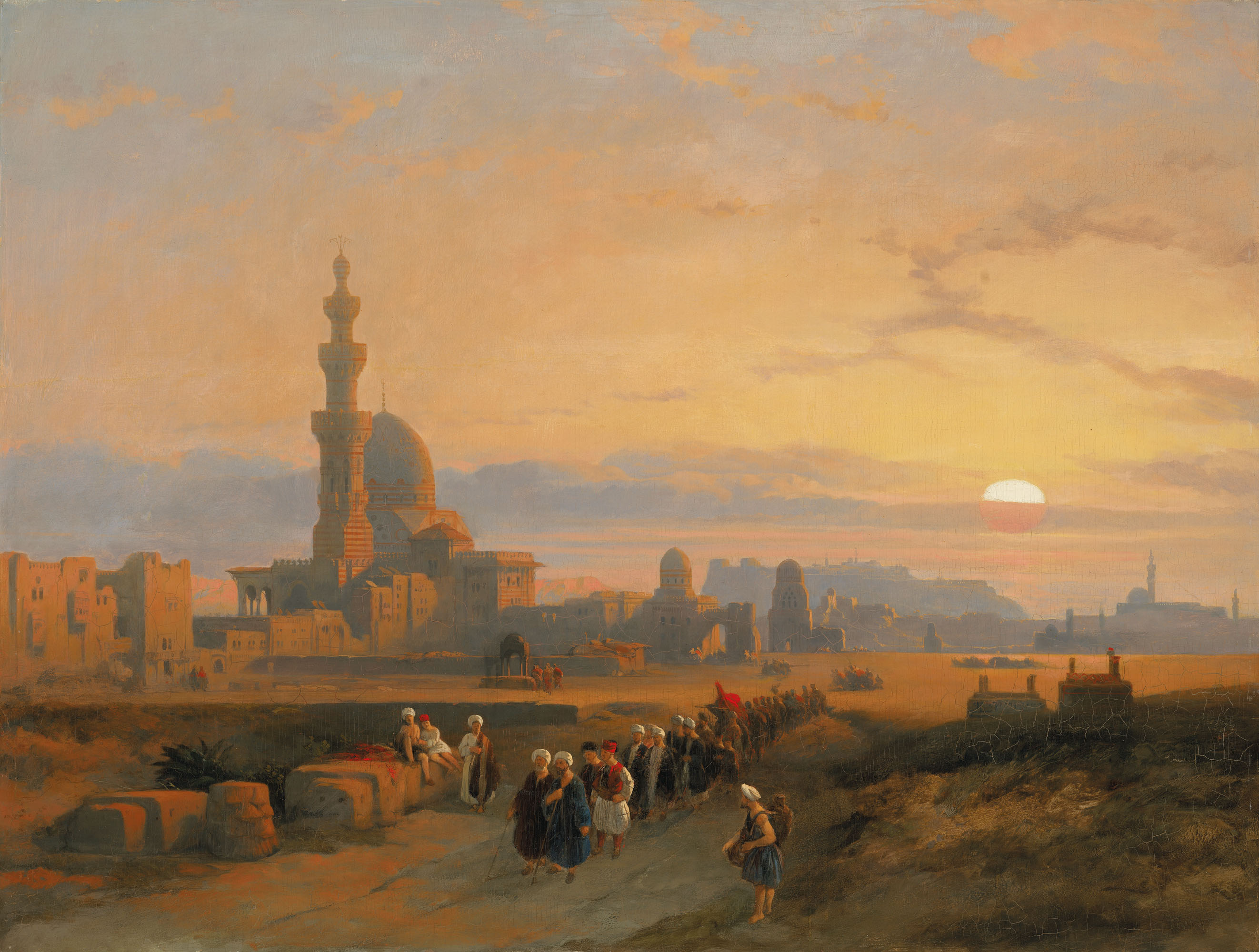
Tomb of the Caliphs by David Roberts

Early Morning, Cromer by William Collins

Shrimpers Hastening Home by William Collins

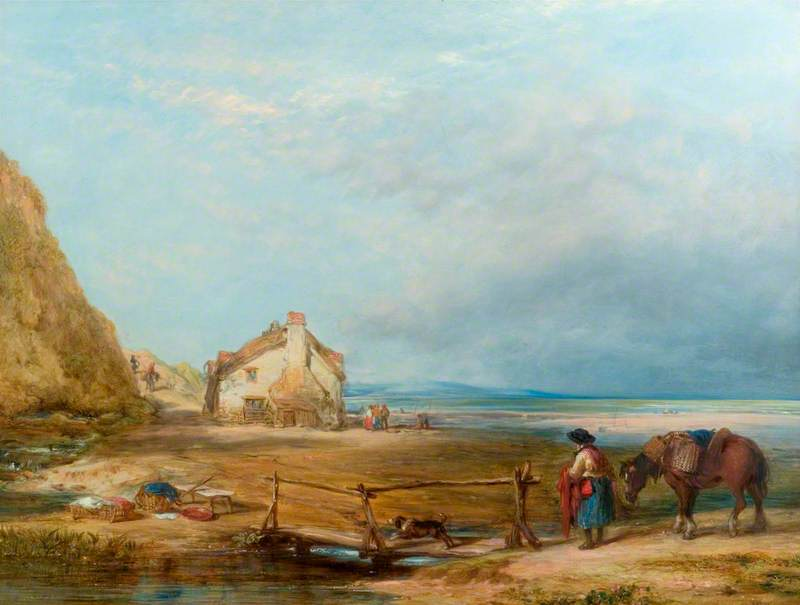
Hall Sands, Devonshire by William Collins

Diana and Her Nymphs Surprised by Actaeon by William Edward Frost

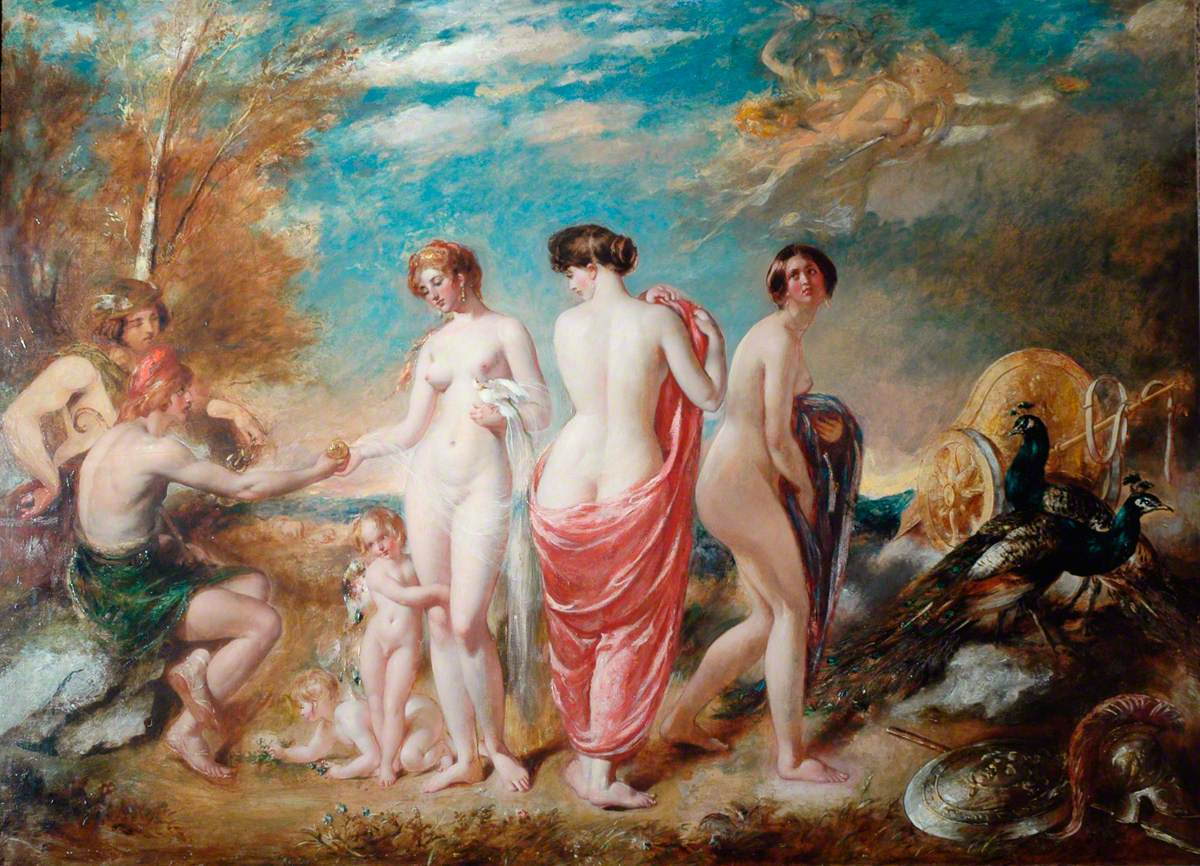
The Choice of Paris by William Etty

Stag at Bay by Edwin Landseer

Refreshment by Edwin Landseer

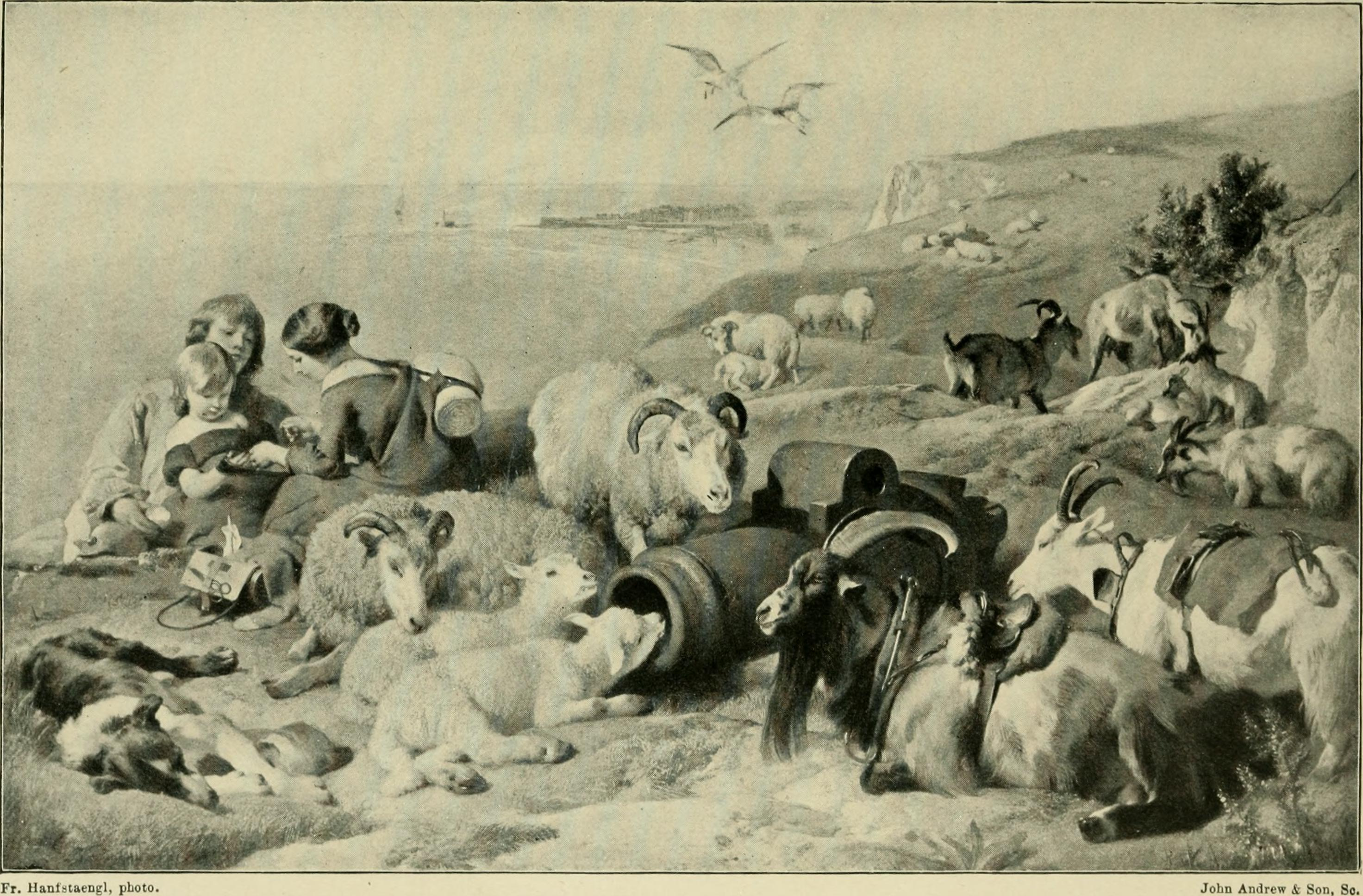
Time of Peace by Edwin Landseer

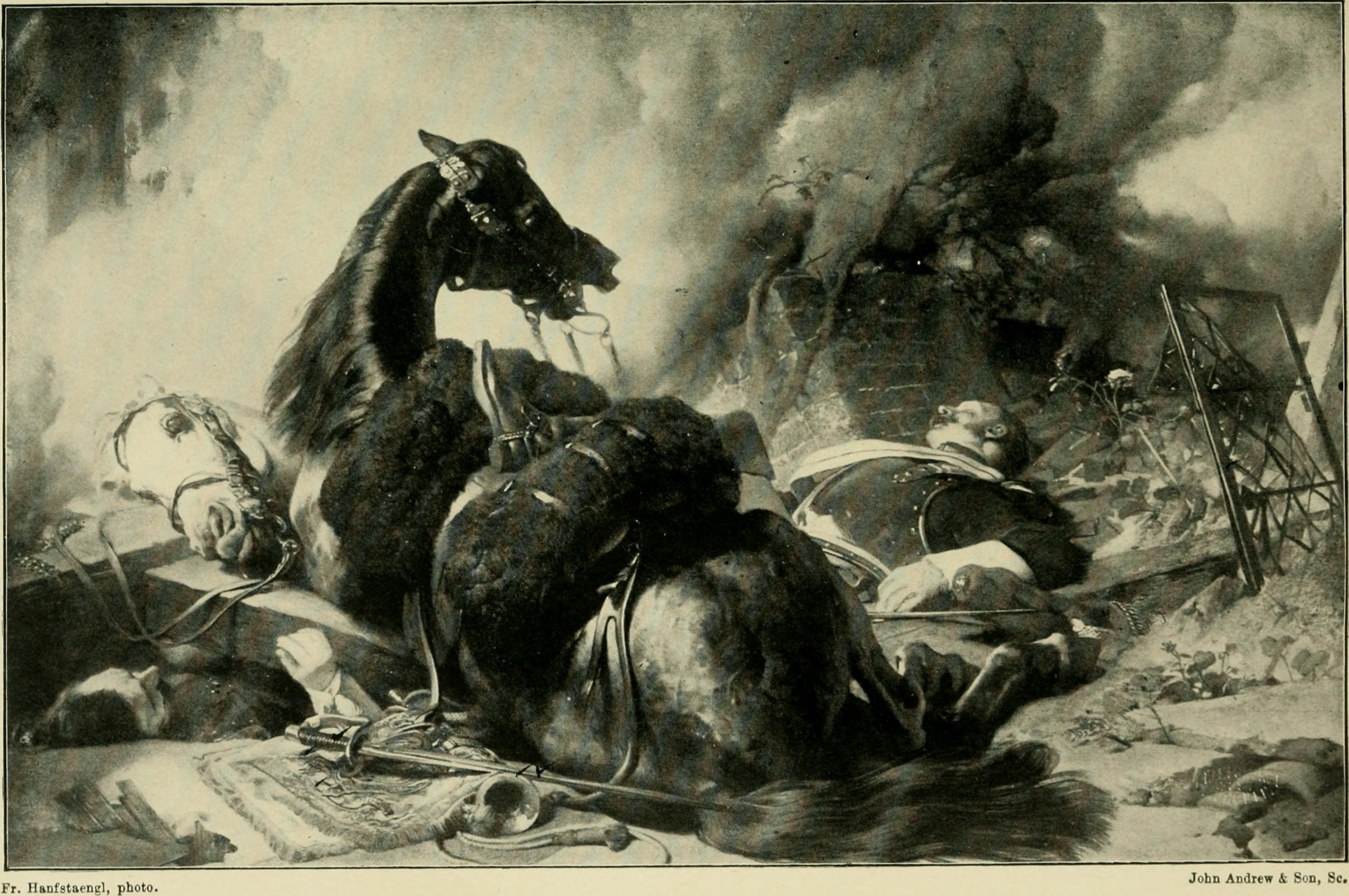
Time of War by Edwin Landseer

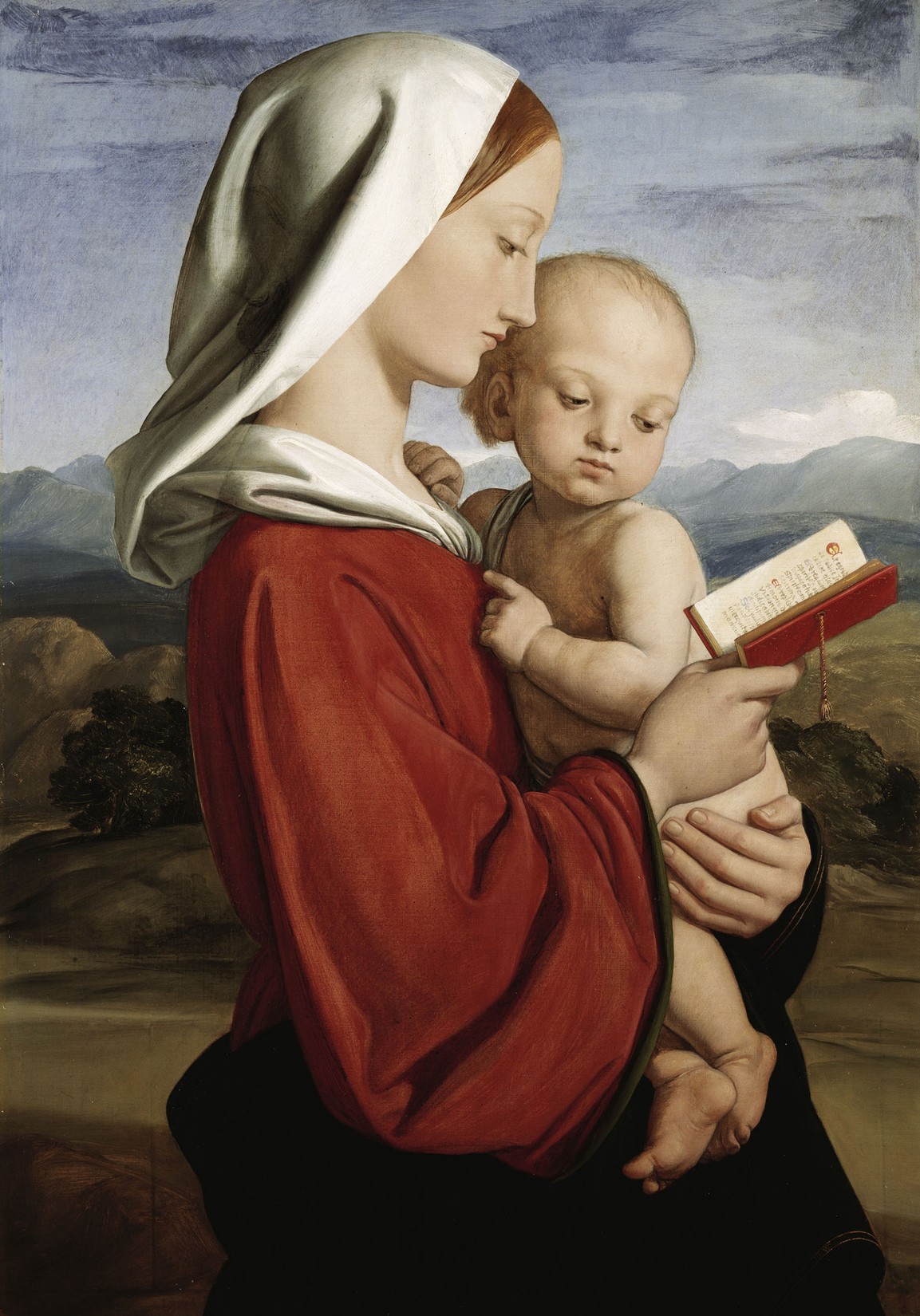
The Madonna and Child by William Dyce

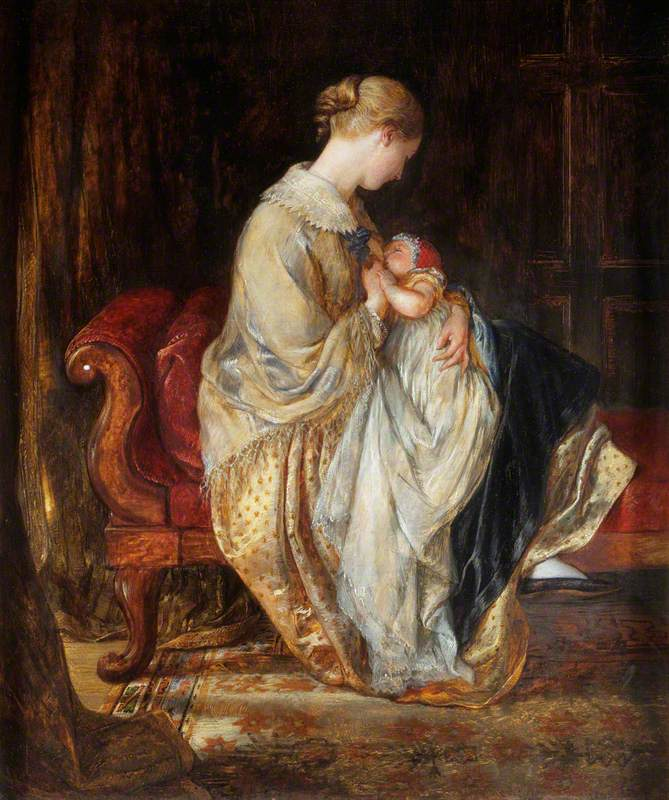
The Young Mother by Charles West Cope

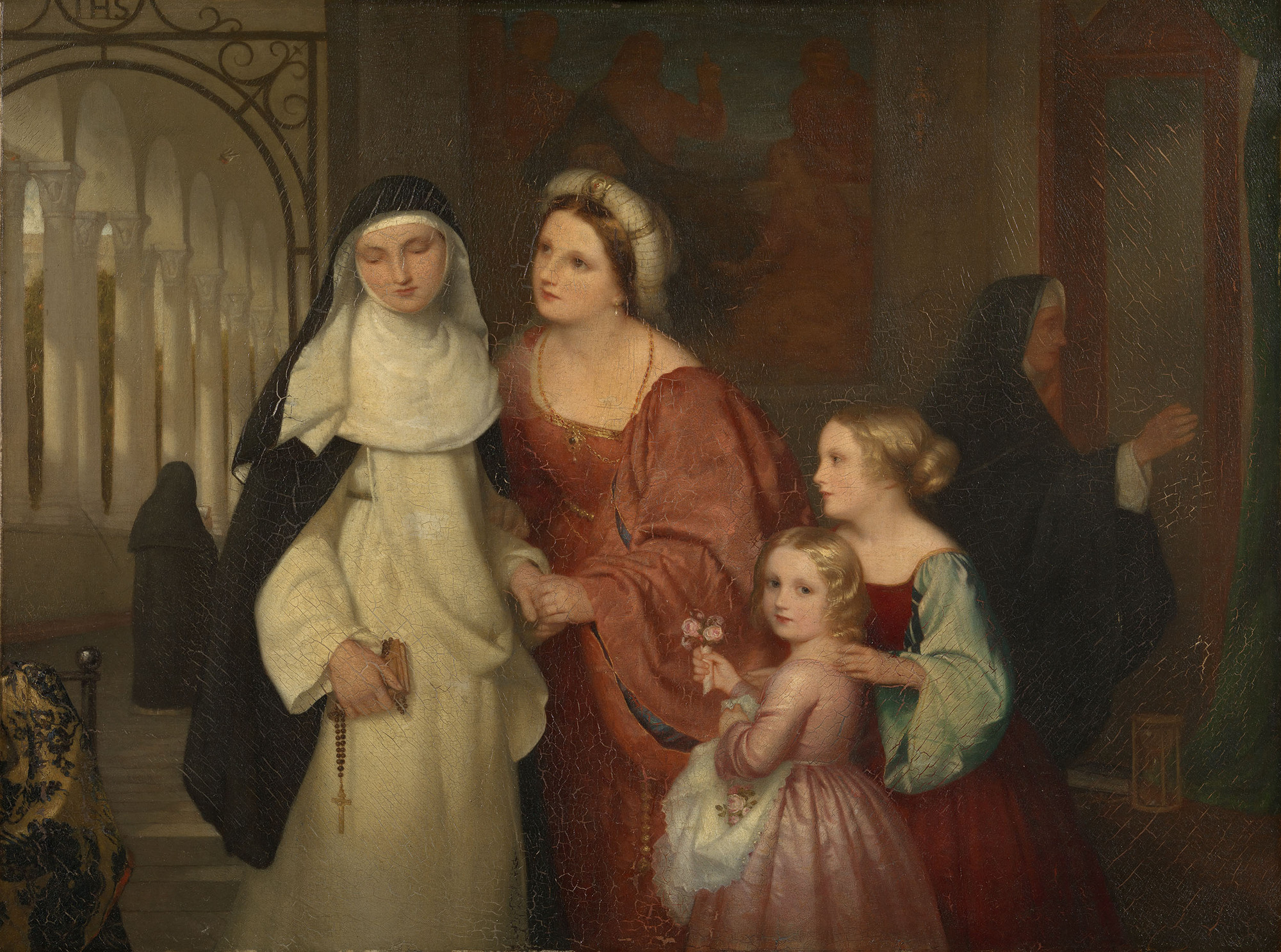
Zia Theresa, The Visit to the Nun by Charles Lock Eastlake

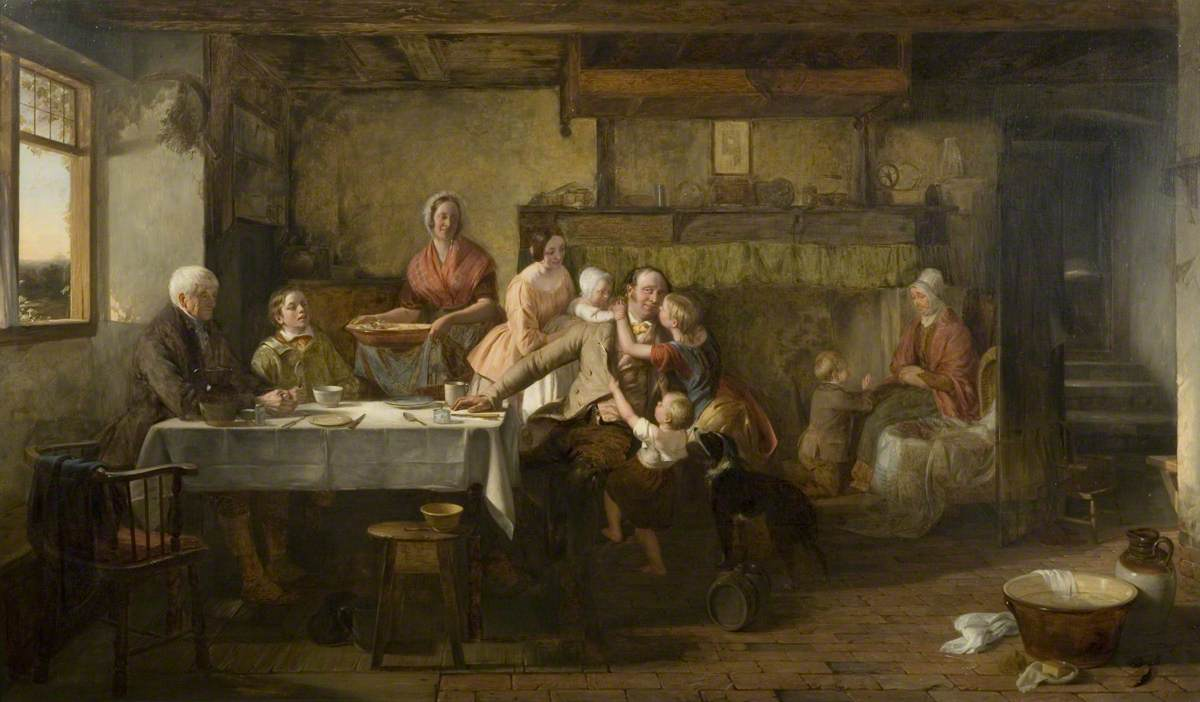
Good Night by Thomas Webster

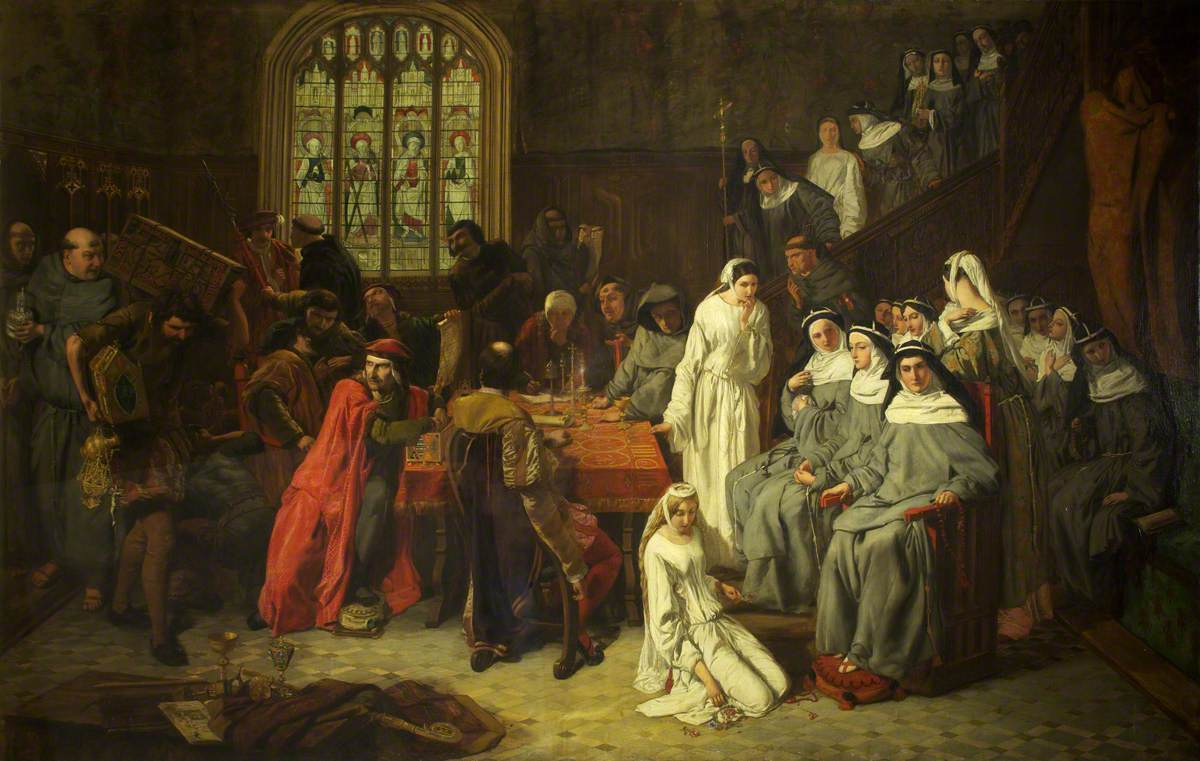
The Visitation and Surrender of Syon Nunnery, 1539 by Paul Falconer Poole

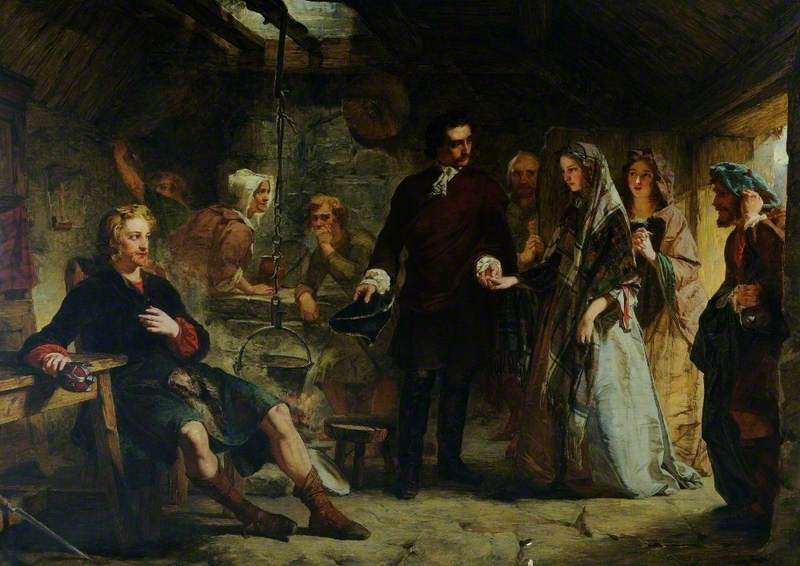
Flora MacDonald's Introduction to Bonnie Prince Charlie by Alexander Johnston

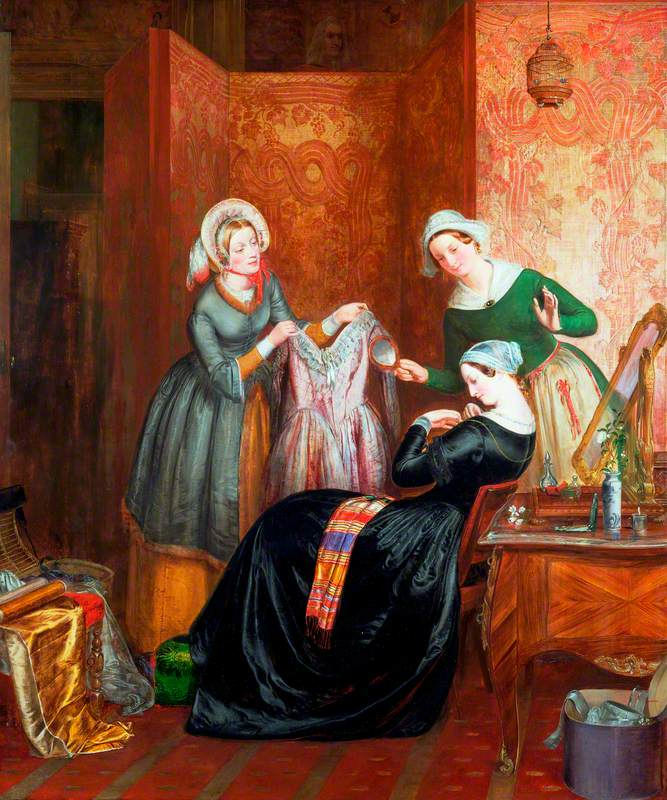
Throwing off Her Weeds by Richard Redgrave

Sunday Morning, The Walk from Church by Richard Redgrave

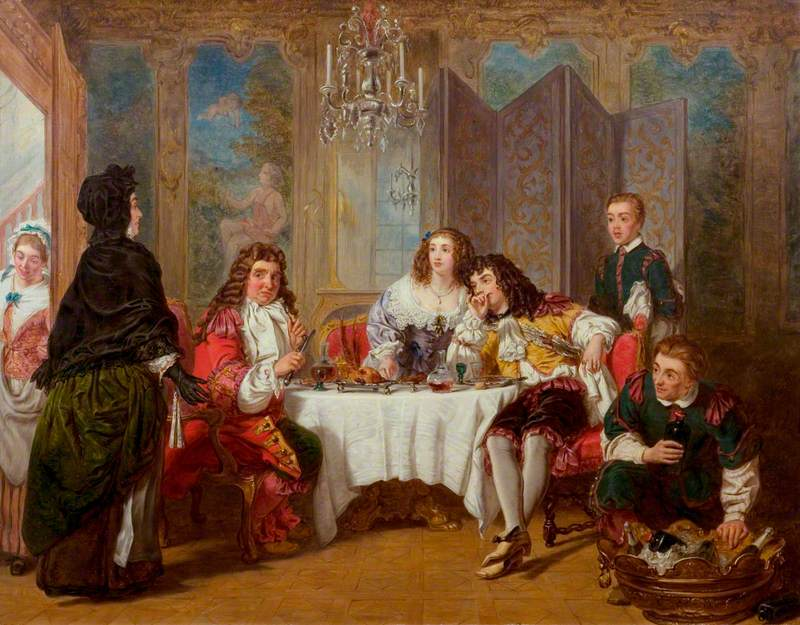
Madame Jourdain Finds Her Husband Entertaining Dorimène and Dorante by William Powell Frith

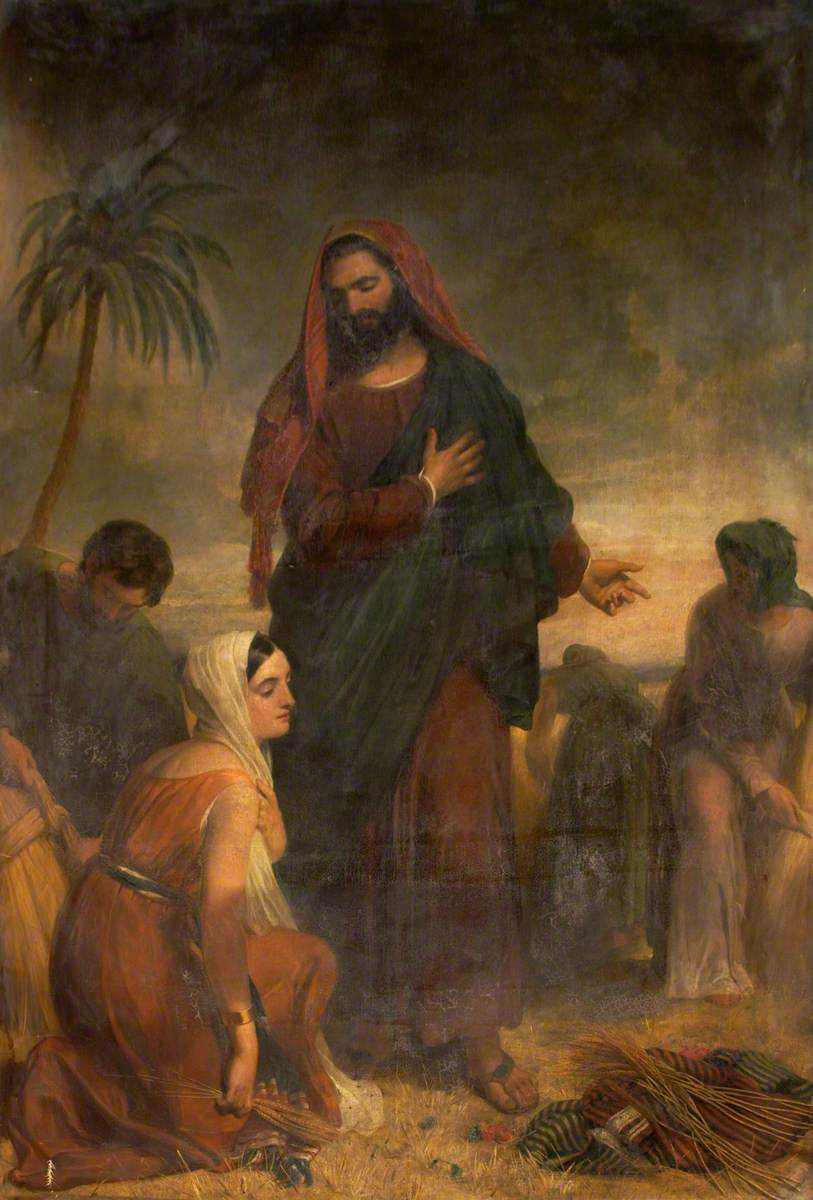
Ruth and Boaz by Henry William Pickersgill

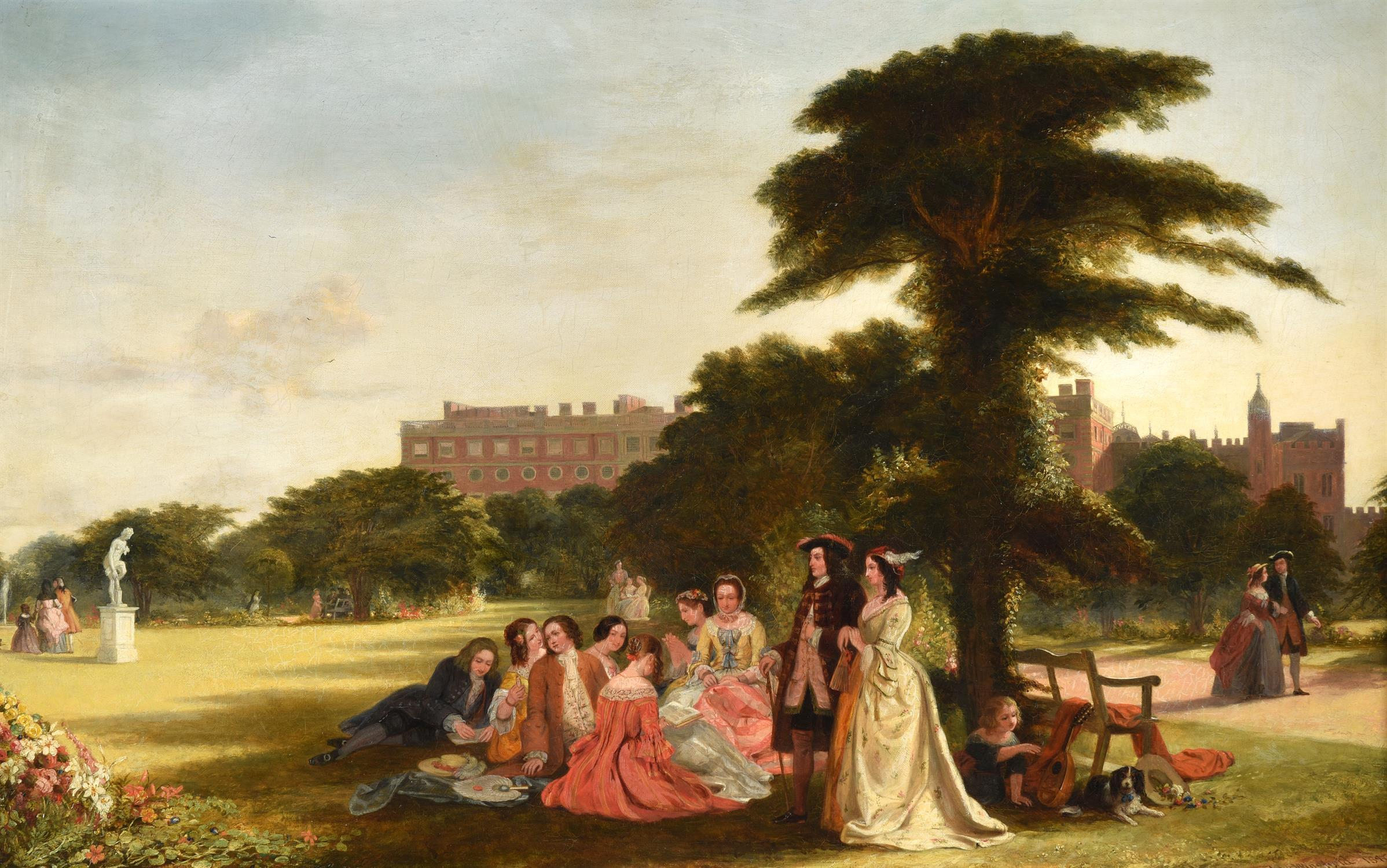
The Palace Garden by James Digman Wingfield

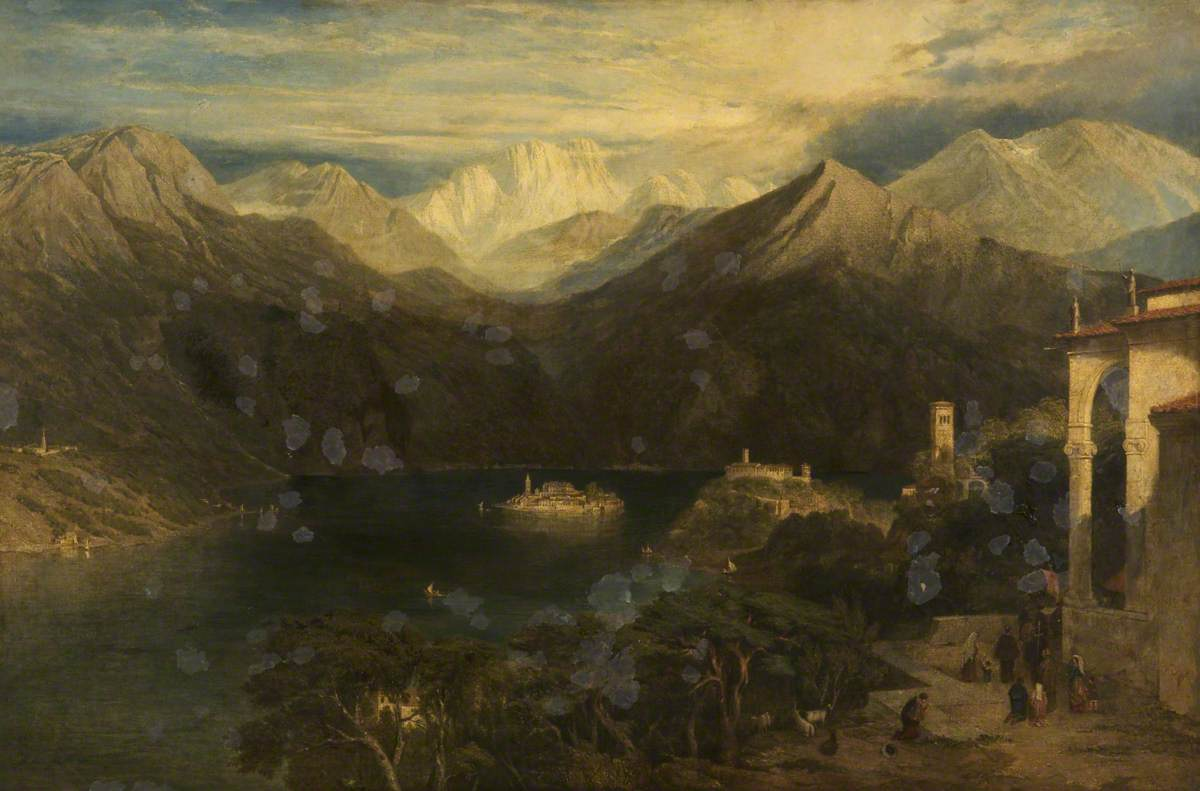
The Lake of Orta by William Linton

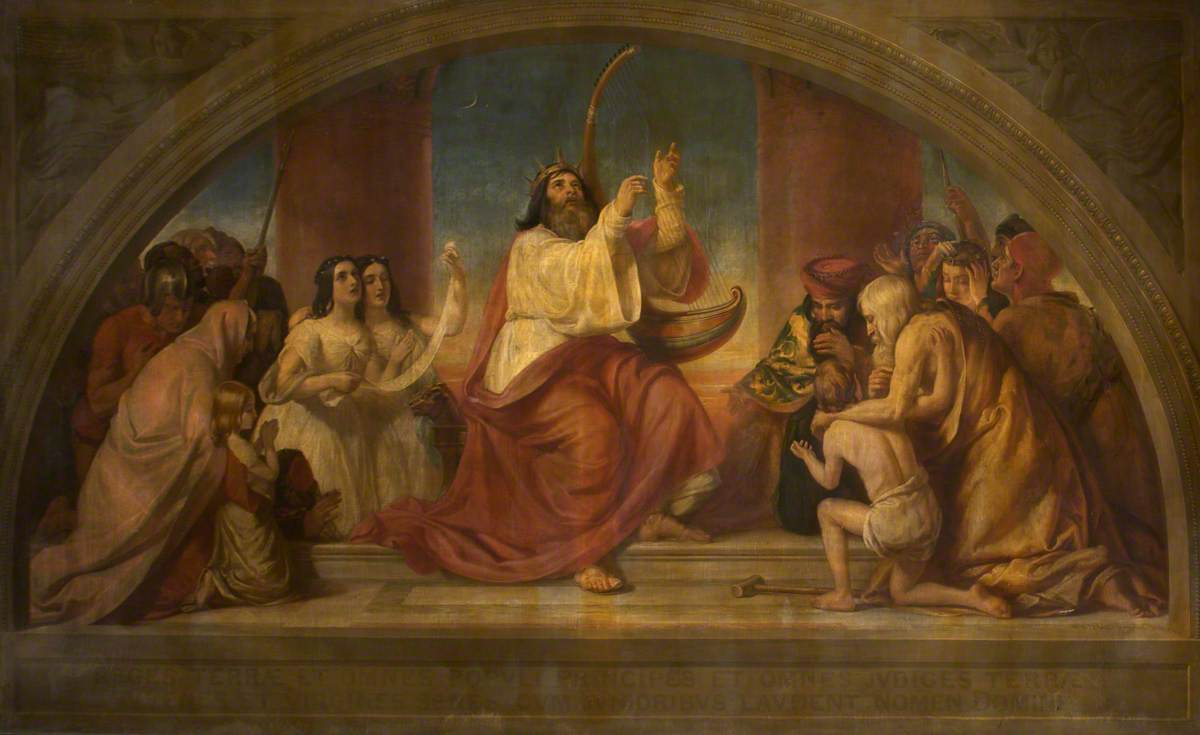
Psalmody by Solomon Hart

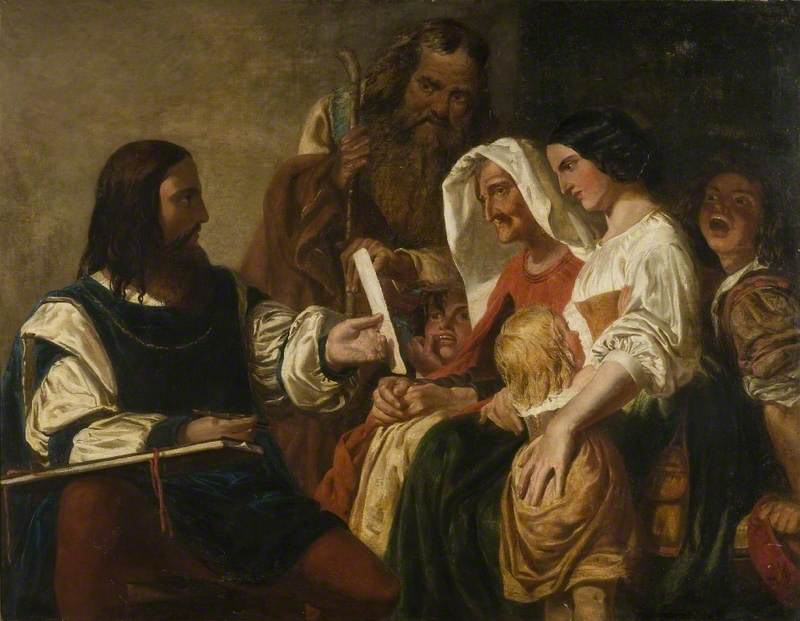
Leonardo and His Models by Henry James Townsend

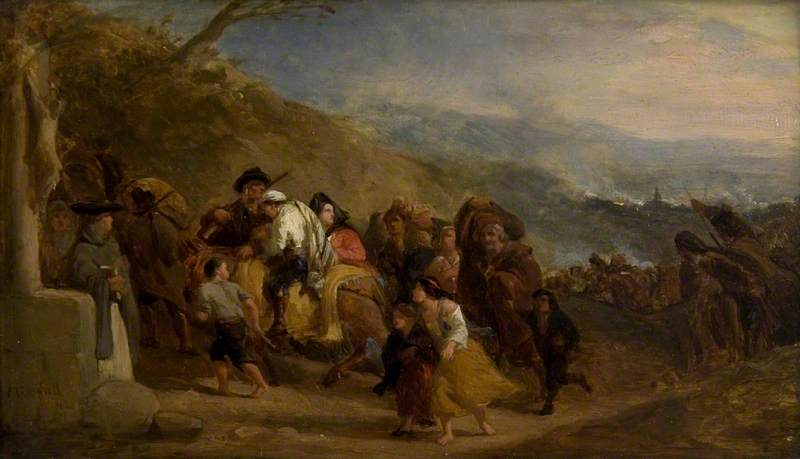
Spanish Peasants Retreating from the French Army by Frederick Goodall

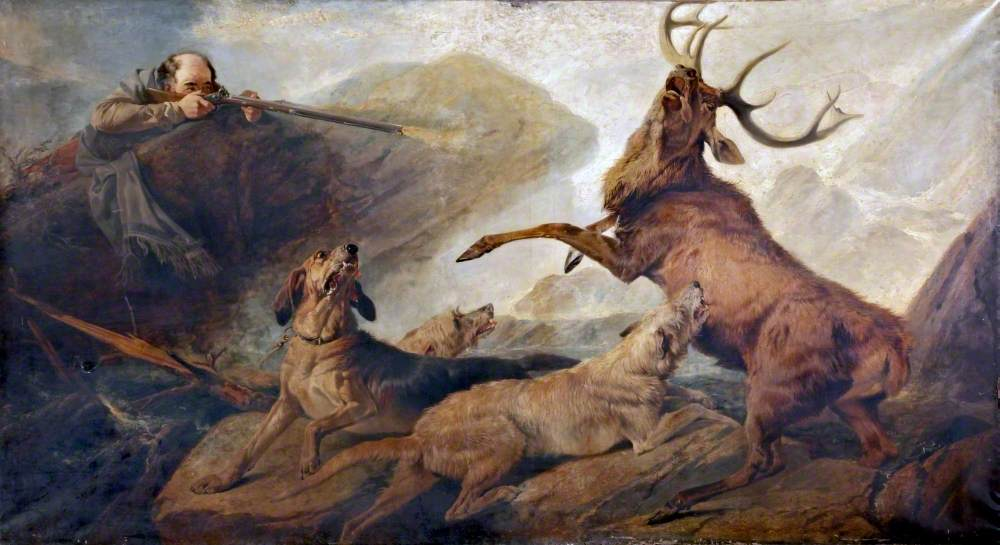
Stag at Bay by Richard Ansdell

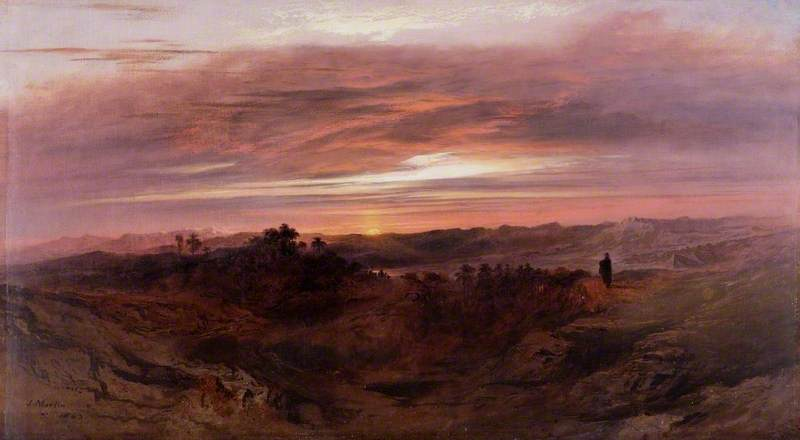
Solitude by John Martin

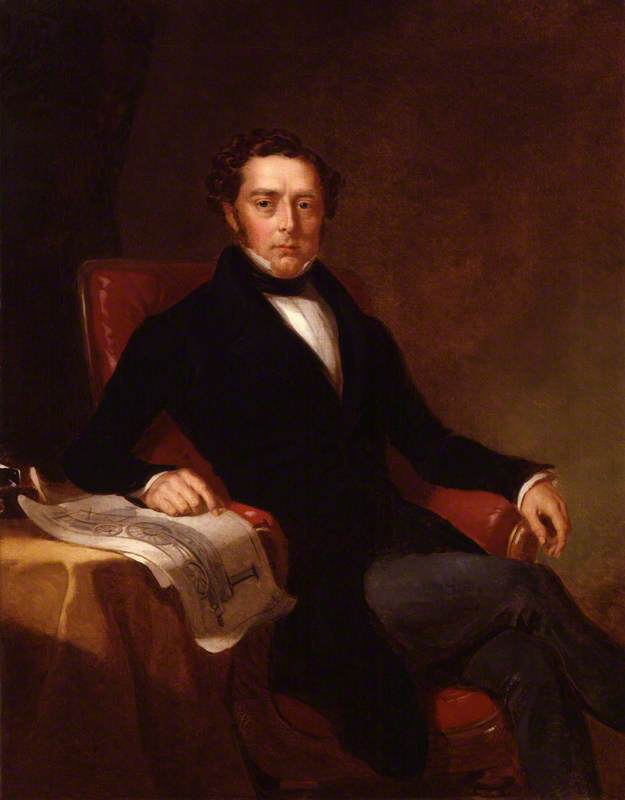
Portrait of Robert Stephenson by John Lucas

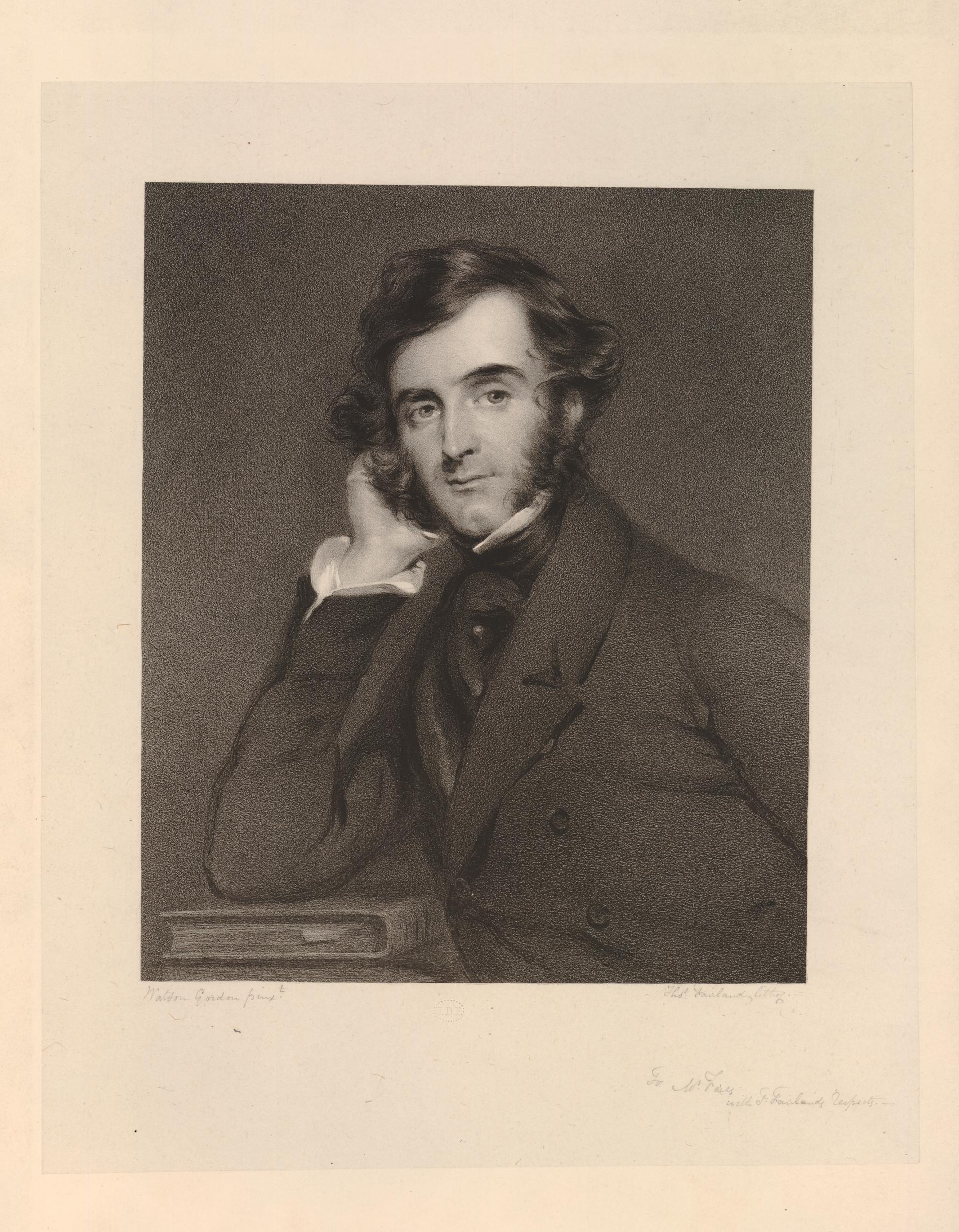
Print based on the Portrait of Francis Grant by John Watson Gordon

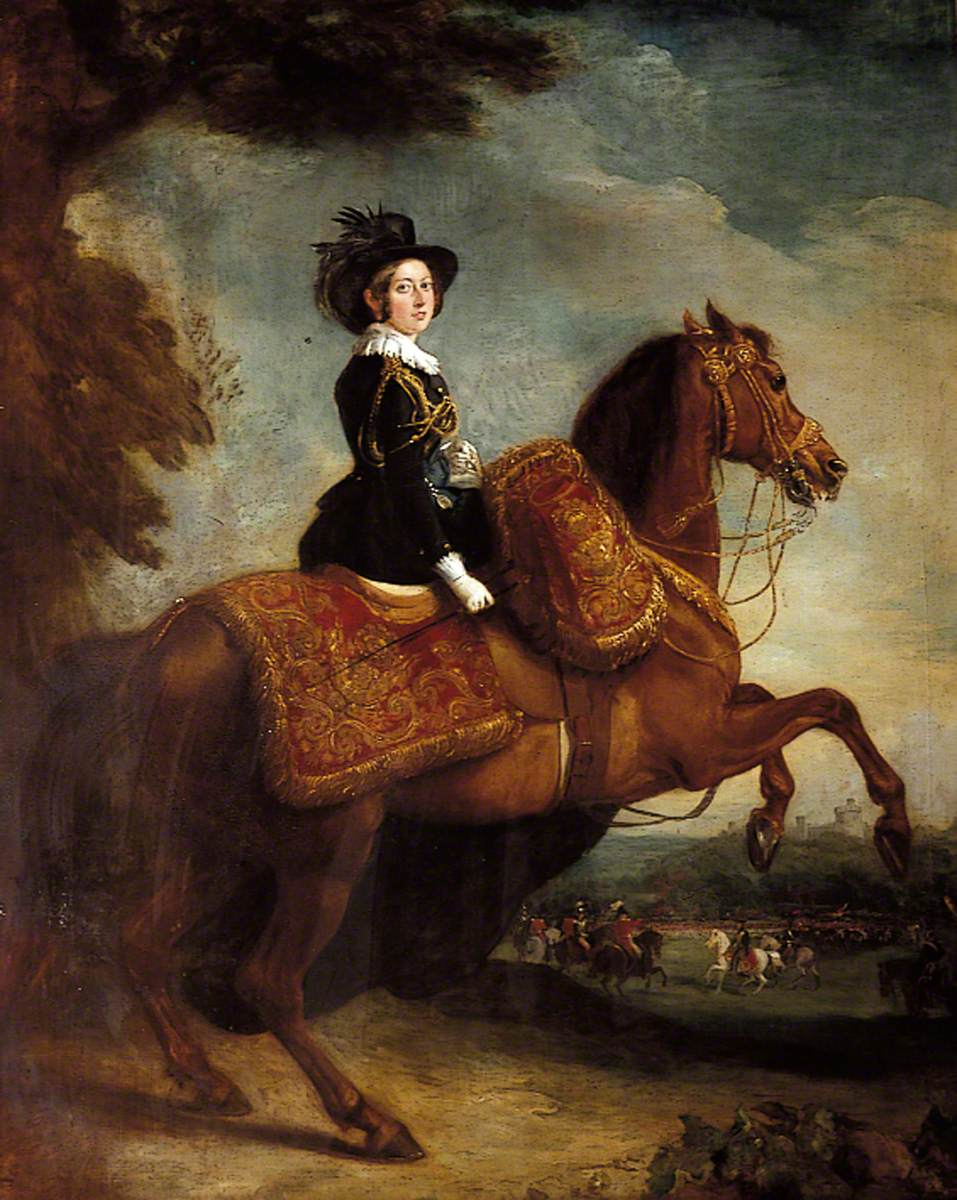
Portrait of Queen Victoria by Francis Grant

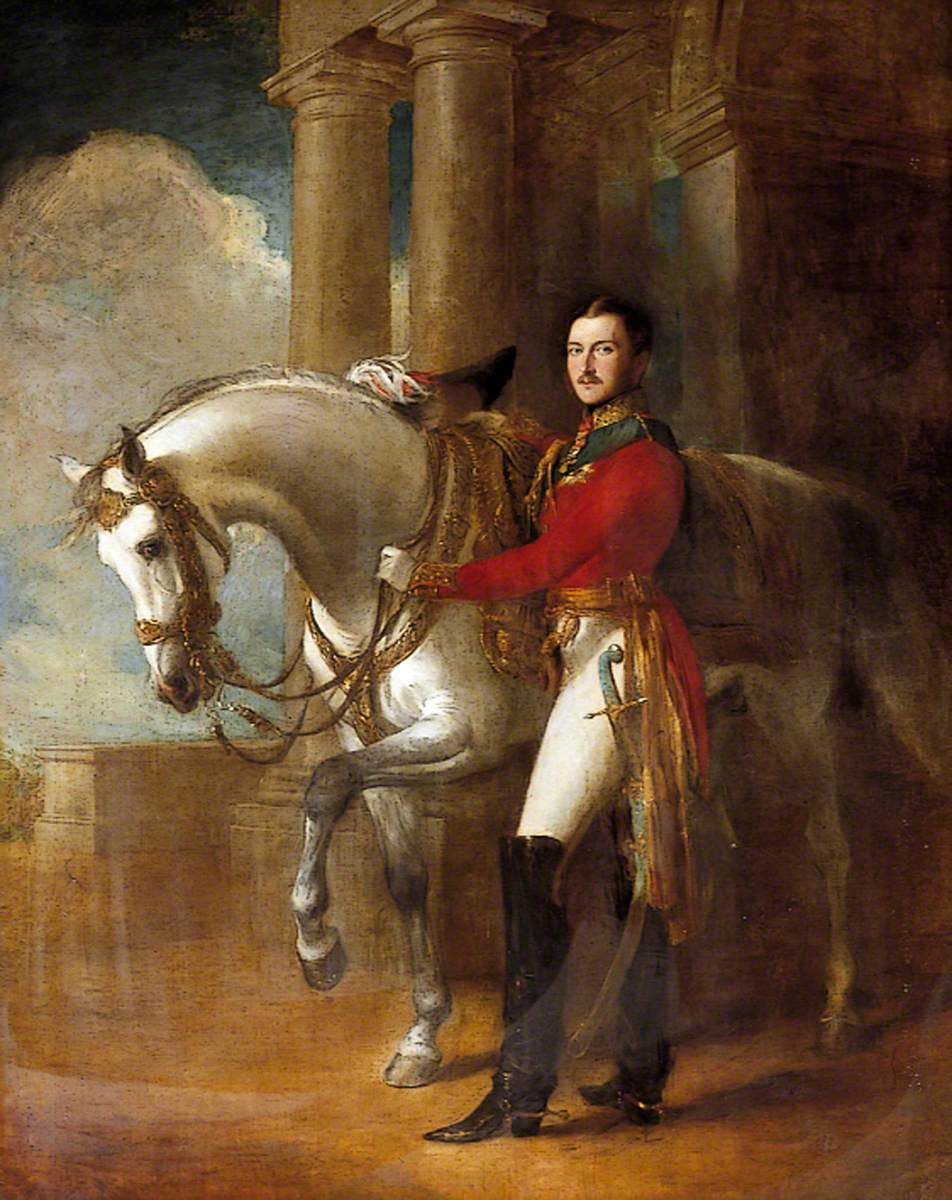
Portrait of Prince Albert by Francis Grant

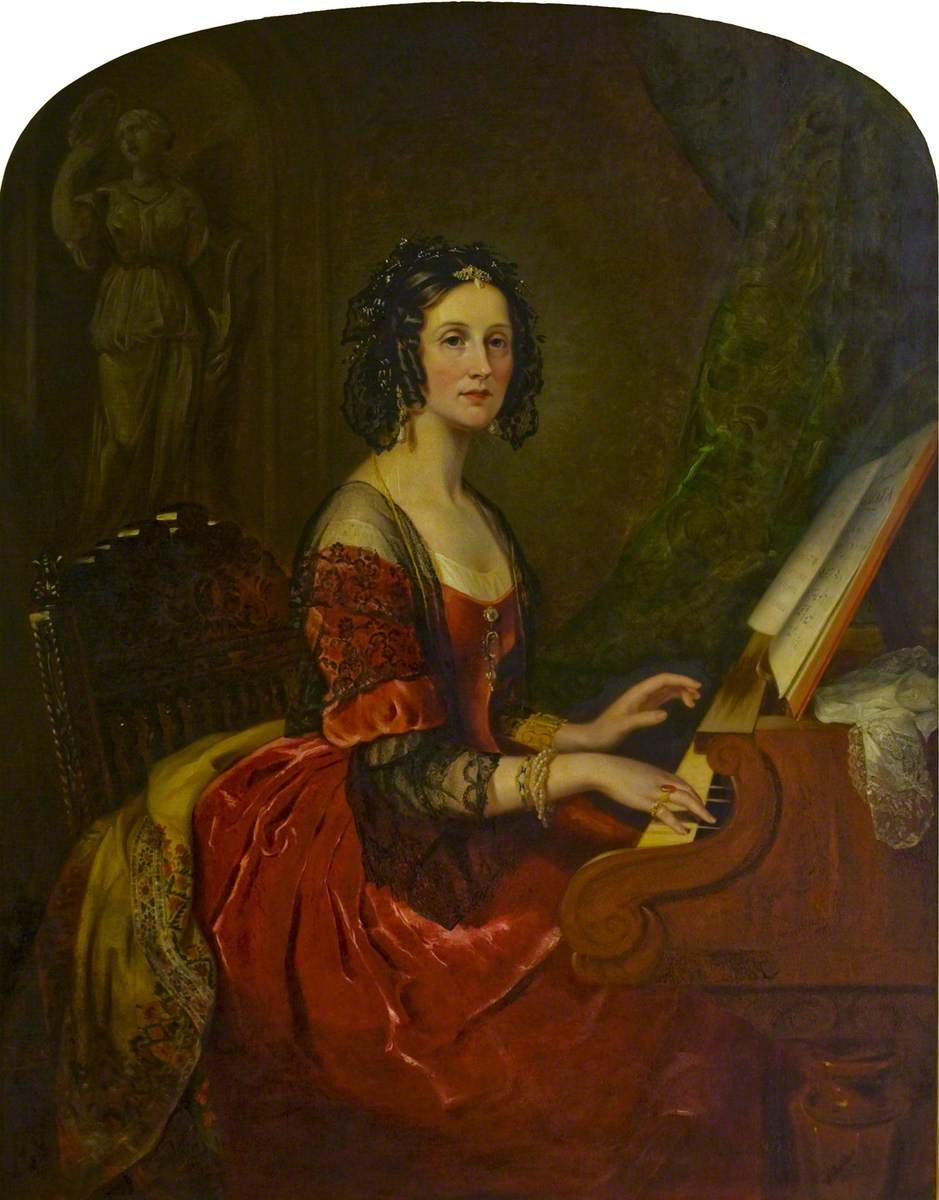
Portrait of the Duchess of Hamilton by Willes Maddox

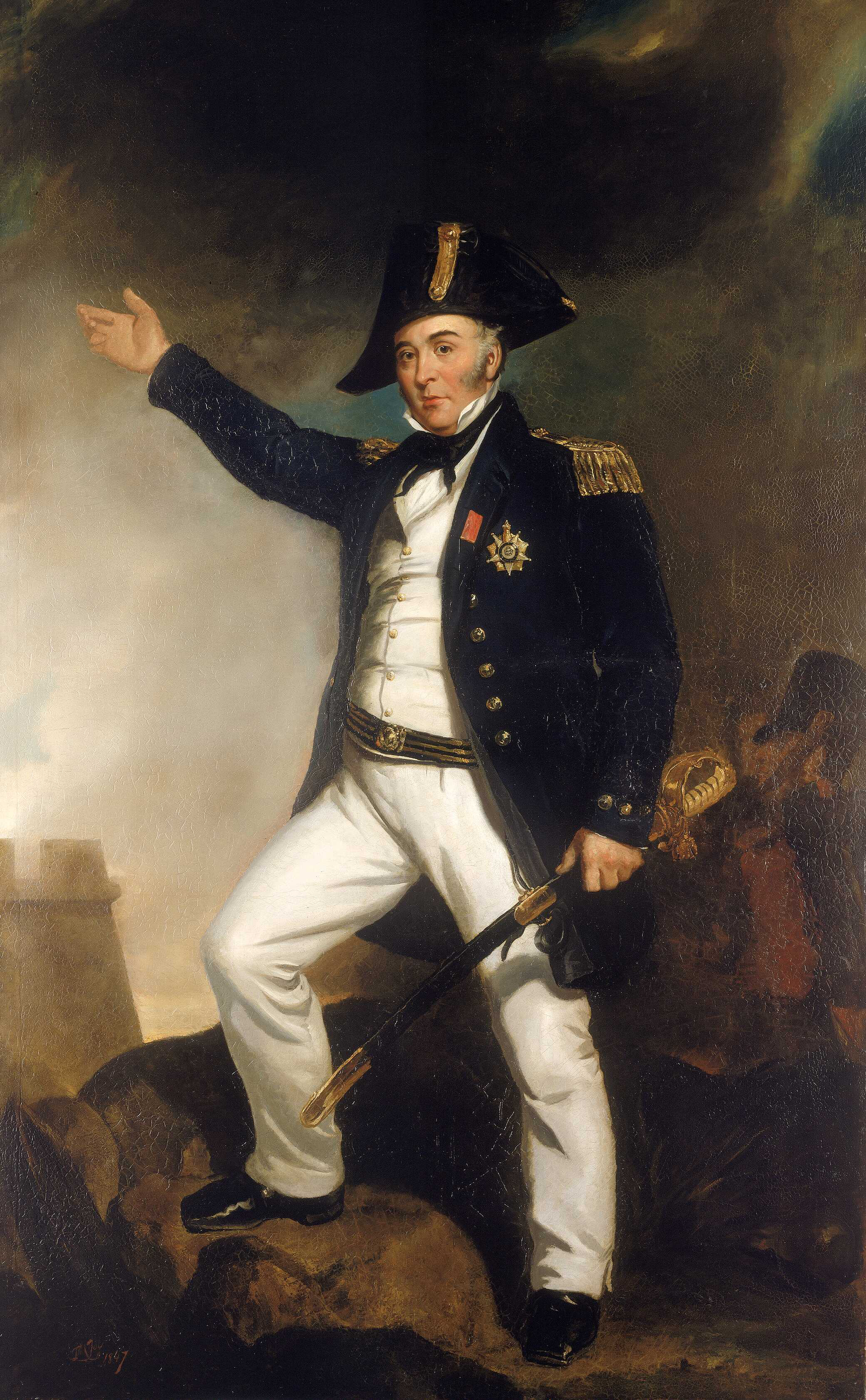
Portrait of Charles Napier by Thomas Musgrave Joy

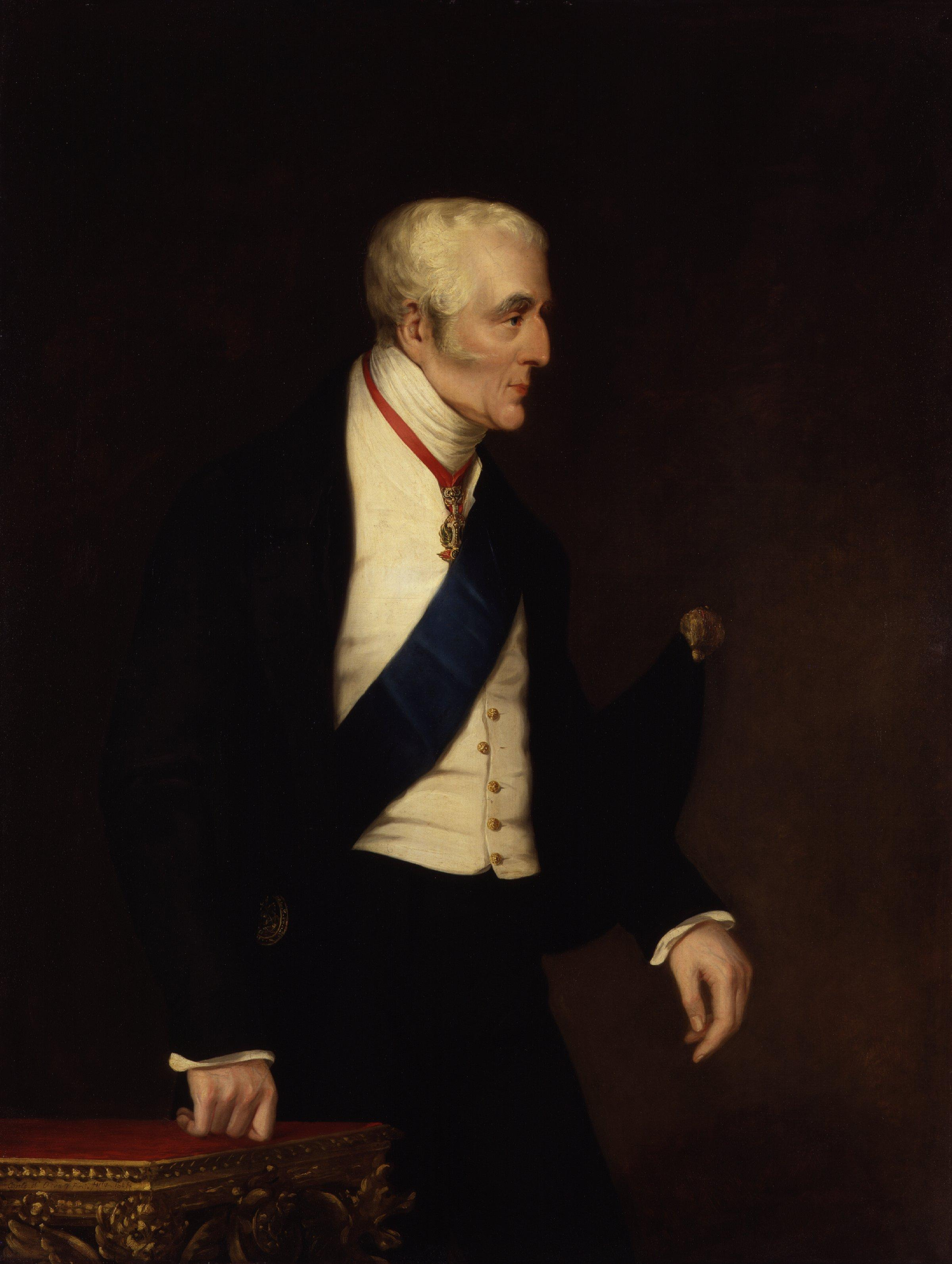
Portrait of the Duke of Wellington by Alfred d'Orsay

== Bibliography ==
- Bailey, Anthony. J.M.W. Turner: Standing in the Sun. Tate Enterprises Ltd, 2013.
- Hamilton, James. Turner - A Life. Sceptre, 1998.
- Herrmann, Luke. Nineteenth Century British Painting. Charles de la Mare, 2000.
- Van der Merwe, Pieter & Took, Roger. The Spectacular Career of Clarkson Stanfield. Tyne and Wear County Council Museums, 1979.
