= Queen Mab's Cave =

Painting by J. M. W. Turner

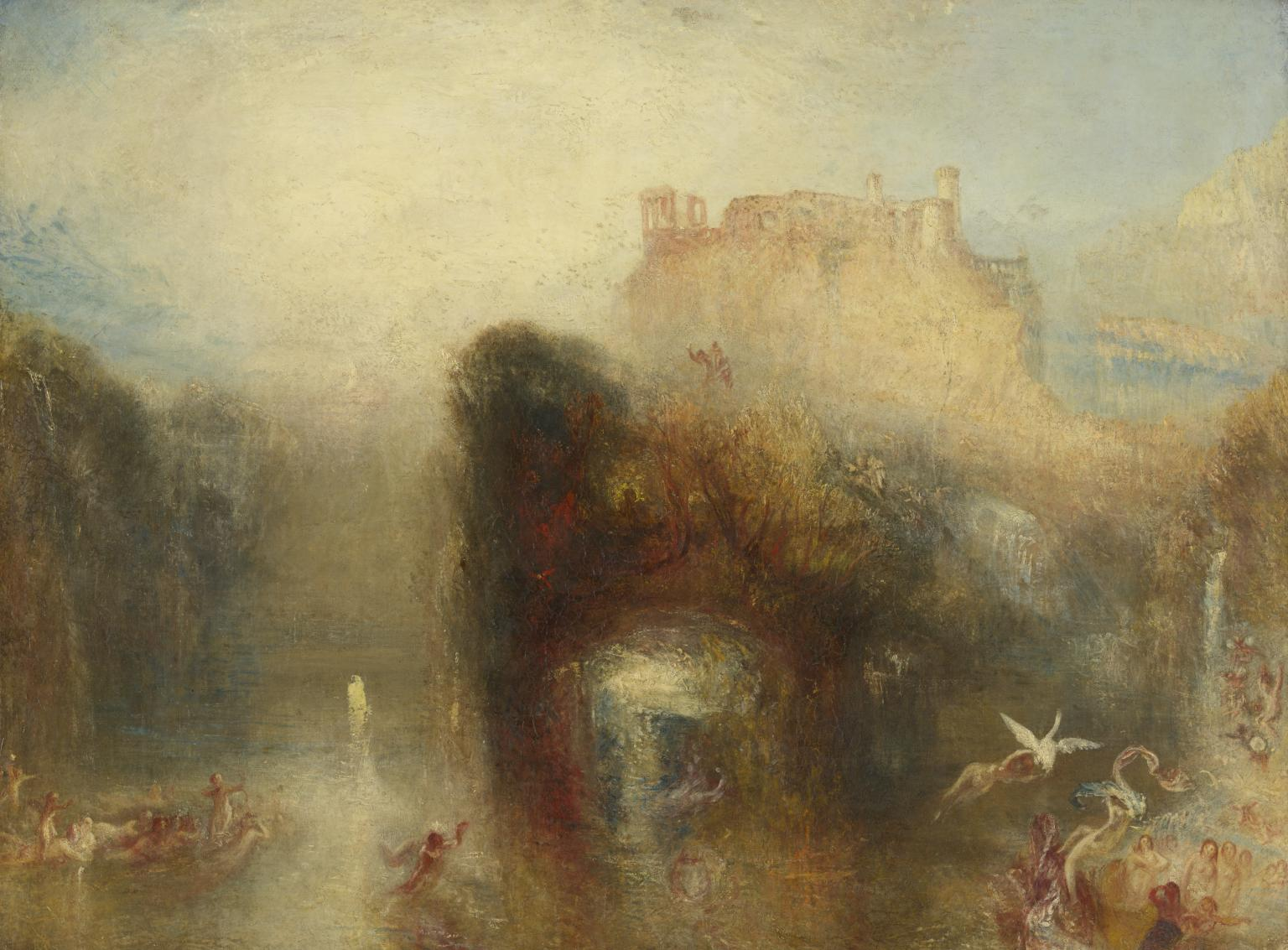
- Artist: J. M. W. Turner
- Year: 1846
- Medium: Oil on canvas
- Dimensions: 122.6 cm × 92.1 cm (48.3 in × 36.3 in)
- Location: Tate Britain, London
- Accession: N00548
- Website: www.tate.org.uk/art/artworks/turner-queen-mabs-cave-n00548

Queen Mab's Cave is an 1846 landscape painting by the British artist J.M.W. Turner. It depicts a view which references the character of Queen Mab by William Shakespeare and likely also inspired by the 1813 poem Queen Mab by Percy Bysshe Shelley, although it does not actually illustrate scenes from either author.

It was exhibited at the British Institution's annual exhibition of 1846. The painting was part of the Turner Bequest of 1856 and is now in the collection of the Tate Britain in Pimlico. A smaller replica is now in the Cleveland Museum of Art.

== See also ==
- List of paintings by J. M. W. Turner

== Bibliography ==
- Brown, Nicola. Fairies in Nineteenth-Century Art and Literature. Cambridge University Press, 2001.
- Gamboni, Dario. Potential Images: Ambiguity and Indeterminacy in Modern Art. Reaktion, 2002.
- Reynolds, Graham. Turner. Thames & Hudson, 2022.
