= The Disgrace of Lord Clarendon =

Painting by Edward Matthew Ward

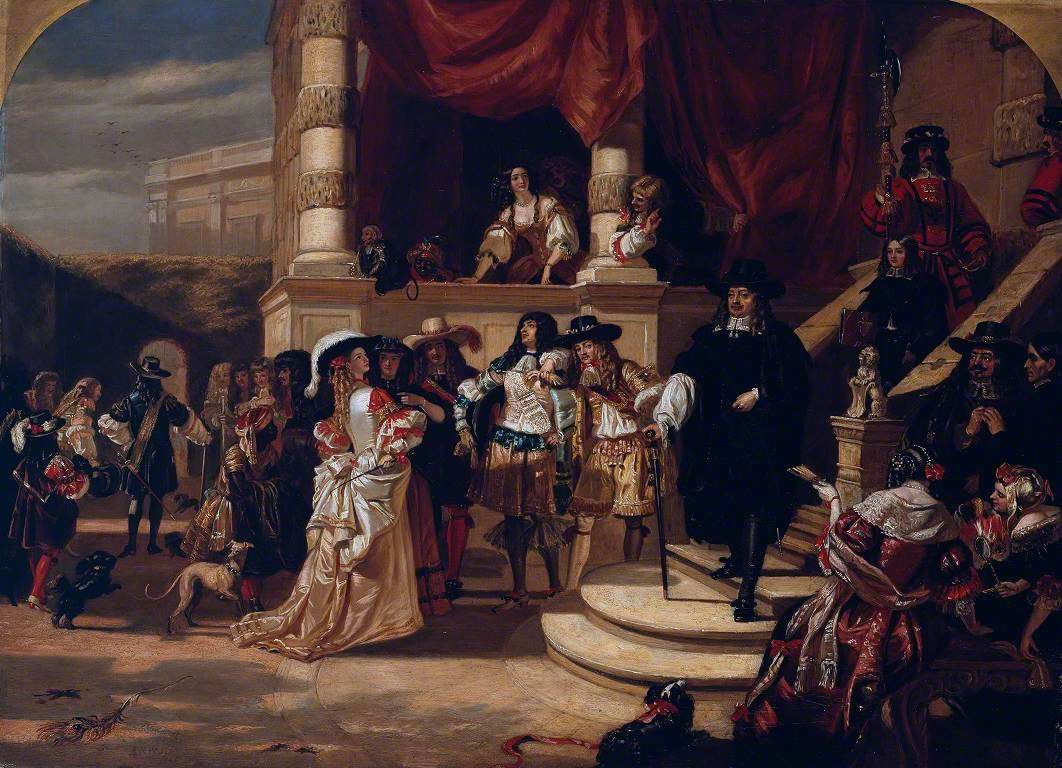
- Artist: Edward Matthew Ward
- Year: 1846
- Type: Oil on canvas, history painting
- Dimensions: 53.3 cm × 73.7 cm (21.0 in × 29.0 in)
- Location: Tate Britain, London

The Disgrace of Lord Clarendon is an oil on canvas history painting by the British artist Edward Matthew Ward, from 1846.

== History and description ==
It depicts a scene from the seventeenth century when the Earl of Clarendon was dismissed from his position as Lord Chancellor and effective chief minister by Charles II. Clarendon had led the Clarendon ministry since the Restoration in 1660. Despite his long service to the Cavalier cause, Clarendon was forced out and replaced by the Cabal. It is also known by the longer title The Disgrace of Lord Clarendon, after his Last Interview with the King - Scene at Whitehall Palace, in 1667

The painting depicts a scene at Whitehall Palace in London where Charles has recently dismissed the Earl from his service. A dignified Clarendon, dressed in black, leaves under the gaze of members of the court, including the royal mistress Lady Castlemaine who are rejoicing over his downfall. Two Beefeaters stand sentry on the steps behind Clarendon. On the left of the painting the back of the king can be seen.

Ward had been a member of the early Victorian artistic group known as The Clique who subsequently painted a number of historical scenes and were critical of the Pre-Raphaelites. The painting was exhibited at the Royal Academy's Summer Exhibition of 1846. A version was donated in 1847 to the National Gallery by the art collector Robert Vernon alongside another of Ward's paintings The South Sea Bubble as part of the Vernon Gift. Today it is in the collection of Tate Britain. Another version is in the Bury Art Museum. A third, dating from 1861 and known as The Fall of Clarendon, is in the Graves Art Gallery in Sheffield.

== Bibliography ==
- Dafforne, James. The Life and Works of Edward Matthew Ward. Virtue and Company, 1879.
- Larkin, T. Lawrence. In Search of Marie-Antoinette in the 1930s: Stefan Zweig, Irving Thalberg, and Norma Shearer. Springer, 2019.
- Ward, Ian. The Trials of Charles I. Bloomsbury Publishing, 2022.
