= A Street in Cairo =

1846 painting by David Roberts

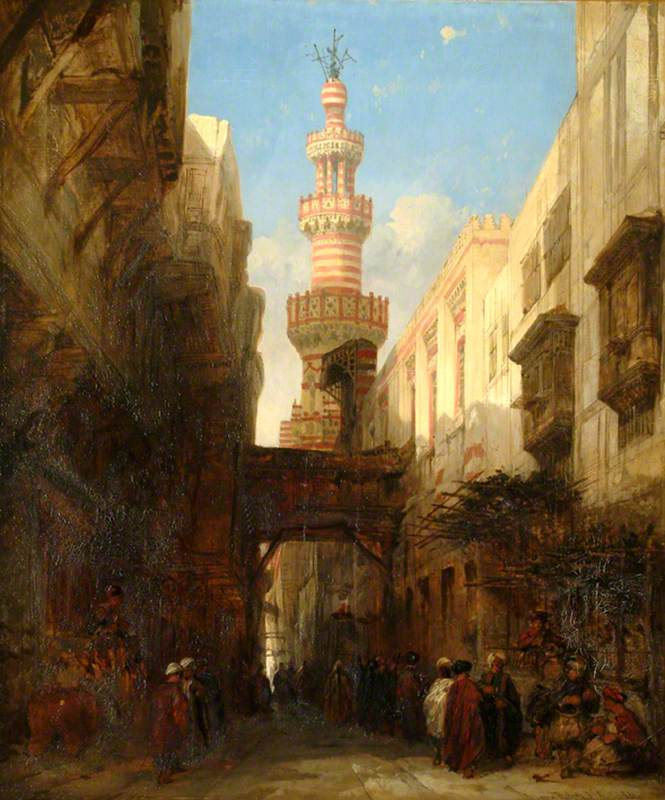
- Artist: David Roberts
- Year: 1846
- Type: Oil on canvas, landscape painting
- Dimensions: 76.1 cm × 63.4 cm (30.0 in × 25.0 in)
- Location: Royal Holloway, Surrey

A Street in Cairo is an 1846 oil painting by the British artist David Roberts. A cityscape, it features a view of the medieval area of Cairo. This was a recurring setting in his paintings of the period.

A former theatre scene painter who specialised in Romantic landscapes, Roberts became noted for his Orientalist style following his extended tour of the Middle East in the late 1830s. The painting was displayed at the Royal Academy Exhibition of 1846 at the National Gallery in London. It was subsequently acquired by the art collector Thomas Holloway, who donated it to Royal Holloway in 1883 as part of a major gift of Victorian era artworks including another Roberts painting Pilgrims Approaching Jerusalem.

It should not be confused by the painting exhibited at the British Institution in 1841 under the same title, but now known as The Bazaar of the Coppersmiths.

== Bibliography ==
- Chappel, Jeannie. Victorian Taste: The Complete Catalogue of Paintings at the Royal Holloway College. A. Zwemmer, 1982
- Clarke, Deborah & Remington, Vanessa. Scottish Artists 1750–1900: From Caledonia to the Continent. Royal Collection Trust, 2015.
- Sim, Katherine. David Roberts R.A., 1796–1864: A Biography. Quartet Books, 1984.
