= On the Dogger Bank =

Painting by Clarkson Stanfield

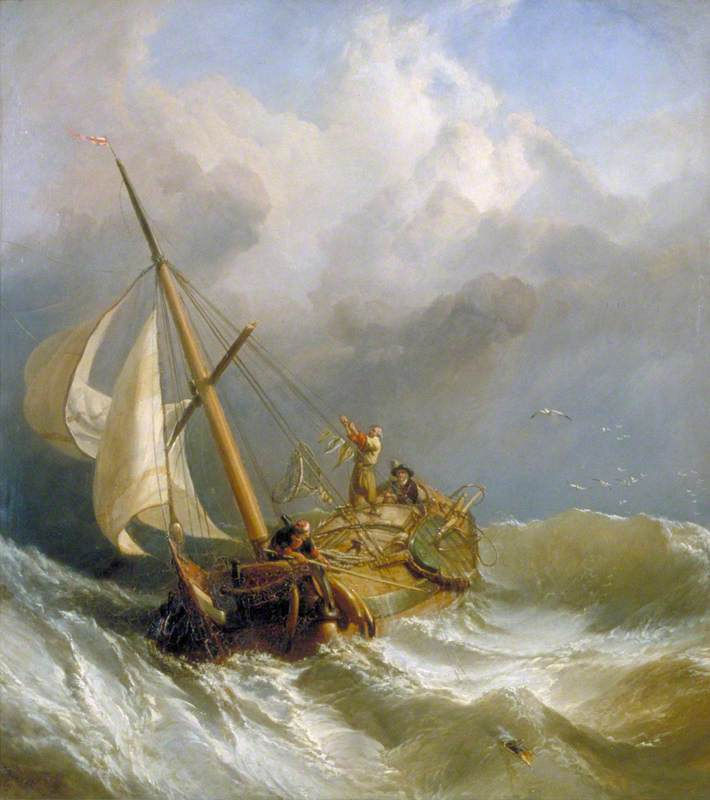
- Artist: Clarkson Stanfield
- Year: 1846
- Type: Oil on canvas, seascape painting
- Dimensions: 76.2 cm × 69.9 cm (30.0 in × 27.5 in)
- Location: Victoria and Albert Museum, London

On the Dogger Bank is an 1846 oil painting by the British artist Clarkson Stanfield. It shows a fishing craft known as a Dogger at sail on the Dogger Bank in the North Sea during a storm. Showing the hazards of fishing in the rough seas, the sprit has broken off the mast and one of the crew is trying to retrieve it. The painting was displayed at the Royal Academy's Summer Exhibition of 1846 at the National Gallery in London under the title A Dutch Dogger Carrying Away her Sprit. It was acquired by the well-known art collector John Jones. Today it is in the collection of the Victoria and Albert Museum in South Kensington, having been acquired as part of the Jones Bequest in 1882.

== Bibliography ==
- Bills, Mark & Knight, Vivien (ed.) William Powell Frith: Painting the Victorian Age. Yale University Press, 2006
- Isham, Howard F. Image of the Sea: Oceanic Consciousness in the Romantic Century. Peter Lang, 2004.
- Parkinson, Ronald. Catalogue of British Oil Paintings 1820-1860. Victoria and Albert Museum, 1990.
- Van der Merwe, Pieter & Took, Roger. The Spectacular career of Clarkson Stanfield. Tyne and Wear County Council Museums, 1979.
