= Cranmer at Traitor's Gate =

Painting by Frederick Goodall

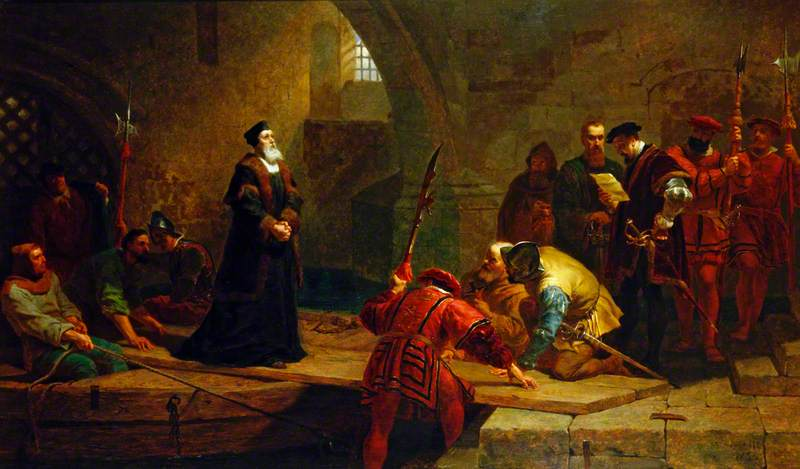
- Artist: Frederick Goodall
- Year: 1856
- Type: Oil on panel, history painting
- Dimensions: 45.6 cm × 74.8 cm (18.0 in × 29.4 in)
- Location: Victoria and Albert Museum, London

Cranmer at Traitor's Gate is an 1856 history painting by the British artist Frederick Goodall. It depicts a scene from the Tudor era during the reign of Mary I. Thomas Cranmer the Protestant Archbishop of Canterbury is brought to the Tower of London on a charge of treason against the Catholic Mary. He is shown at the notorious Traitors' Gate entrance, his manner serene and calm despite his imminent execution.

The picture was displayed at the Royal Academy Exhibition of 1856 held at the National Gallery in London. The following year it appeared at the Art Treasures Exhibition in Manchester. Today the original is held in the collection of the Victoria and Albert Museum, having been part of the Jones Bequest of 1882. A replica by an unknown artist belongs to the Tower of London, which acquired it in 1997. The painting was also turned into a print by the engraver Edward Goodall, the father of the artist.

== Bibliography ==
- Leahy, Helen Rees. Art, City, Spectacle: The 1857 Manchester Art-Treasures Exhibition Revisited. University of Manchester, 2005.
- Roe, Sonia. Oil Paintings in Public Ownership in the Victoria and Albert Museum. Public Catalogue Foundation, 2008.
