= Frederick Goodall =

English painter

Frederick Goodall RA
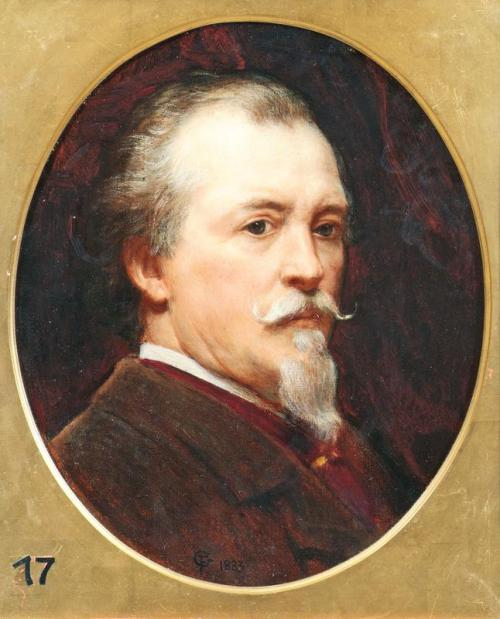
- Self-portrait 1882
- Born: 17 September 1822; St John's Wood, London, England
- Died: 29 July 1904 (aged 82)
- Resting place: Highgate Cemetery
- Education: Wellington Road Academy
- Known for: Oil paintings
- Movement: Orientalist
- Spouse: Ann Thomson

Frederick Goodall RA (17 September 1822 – 29 July 1904) was an English painter, normally of figure subjects, often on large scale. He painted many genre and historical subjects, and used his visits to Egypt in 1858 and 1870 to provide material both for Biblical subjects, and others treating contemporary Egyptian life. He exhibited work at the Royal Academy 27 times between 1838 and 1859, and was elected an Associate of the Royal Academy (ARA) in 1852 and a full Royal Academician (RA) in 1863.

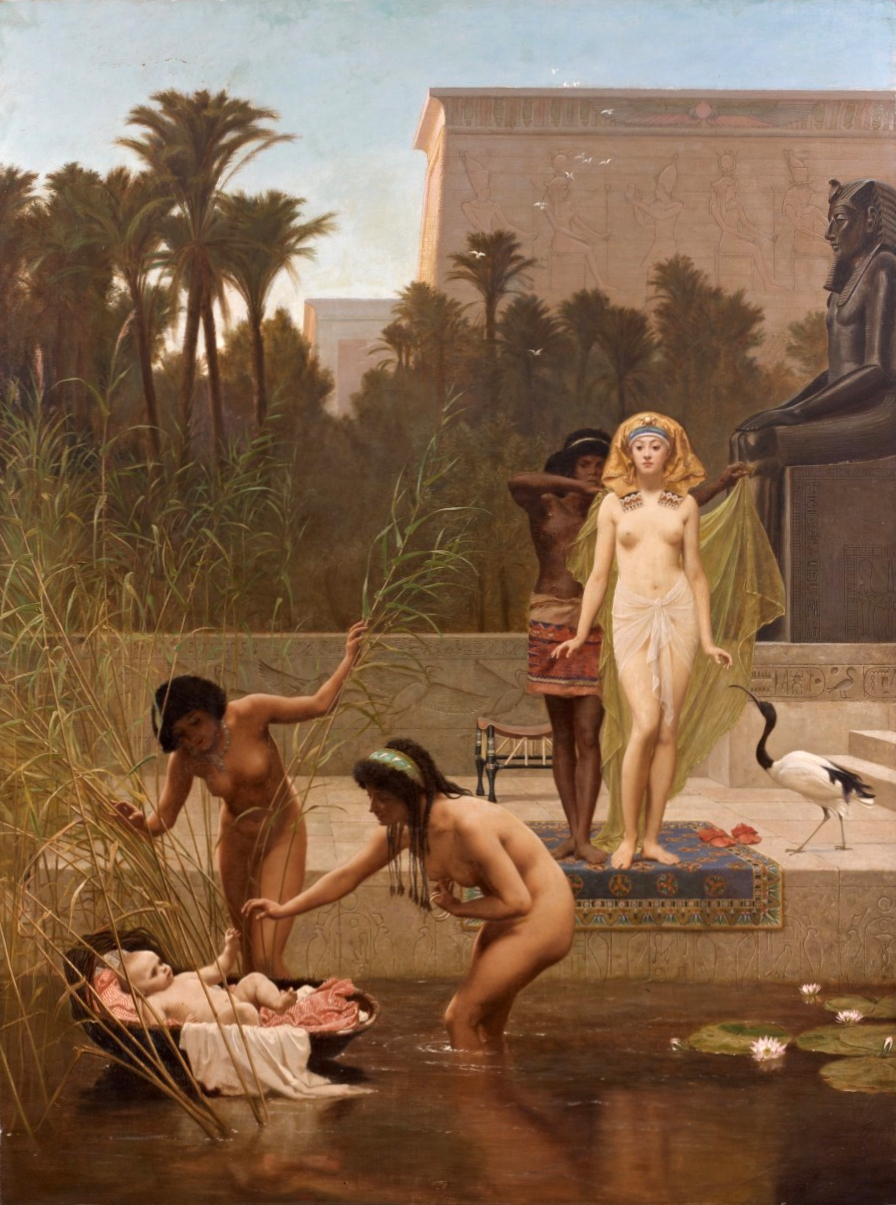
The Finding of Moses, 1885

He was extremely successful for most of his career, but his style fell from favour, and he was declared bankrupt in 1902.

His father, two brothers and a sister, and two of his sons, were also notable painters.

== Life ==
Frederick Goodall was born in London in 1822, the second son of steel line engraver Edward Goodall (1795–1870). He received his education at the Wellington Road Academy.

Goodall's first commission, for Isambard Brunel, was six watercolour paintings of the Thames Tunnel. Four of these were exhibited at the Royal Academy when Goodall was 16. His first oil won a Society of Arts silver medal.

Goodall visited Egypt twice; in 1858 and again in 1870, both times travelling and camping with Bedouin tribesmen. On his first visit to Egypt, he shared a house and studio with artist, Carl Haag and the pair often sketched together, both in the streets and outside Cairo, especially in the area around the Pyramids. On his second visit in 1870, he lived at Saqqara, near the Pyramids with the aim of directly observing Bedouin lifestyles. After his return to England, Goodall painted many variations of the same Eastern themes. In order to provide authentic detail to his paintings, Goodall brought back sheep and goats from Egypt. The Egyptian theme was prominent in his work, with 170 paintings being exhibited at the Royal Academy over 46 years.

Goodall's work received high praise and acclaim from critics and artists alike and he earned a fortune from his paintings. He had a home built, Grims Dyke, Harrow Weald, (1870–2), designed by Norman Shaw, where he would entertain guests such as the Prince of Wales (later Edward VII).

== Family ==
Goodall married Anne Thomson (26 Dec 1822–11 Aug 1869), daughter of the engraver James Thomson, in 1846. Among their five children were the promising painters Frederick Trevelyan and Howard Goodall. Frederick Trevelyan was the more successful in a very short career, dying following a pistol accident in Capri at the age of 24 in 1871, shot by his younger brother, who himself died three years later. Following the death of Anne, who is buried in Highgate Cemetery in 1869, Goodall married the artist Alice May Tarry in 1872. They had two children.

Frederick Goodall's brother, Edward Angelo Goodall (1819–1908) was also a highly gifted artist who exhibited at the RA from 1846 to 1853. A specialist in watercolours, he was invited to join the Royal Watercolour Society in 1856 and exhibited 328 pictures at its exhibitions. It was Edward who had the distressing task of arranging the sale of his brother's pictures and effects when he was declared bankrupt in 1902. His other brother Walter Goodall, and sister Eliza Goodall, were also artists.

== Death ==
Although hugely wealthy at the height of his career, his income dwindled during his final years and when he died in 1904 he was bankrupt. He was buried in a family vault (no.16876) on the western side of Highgate Cemetery.

== Gallery ==
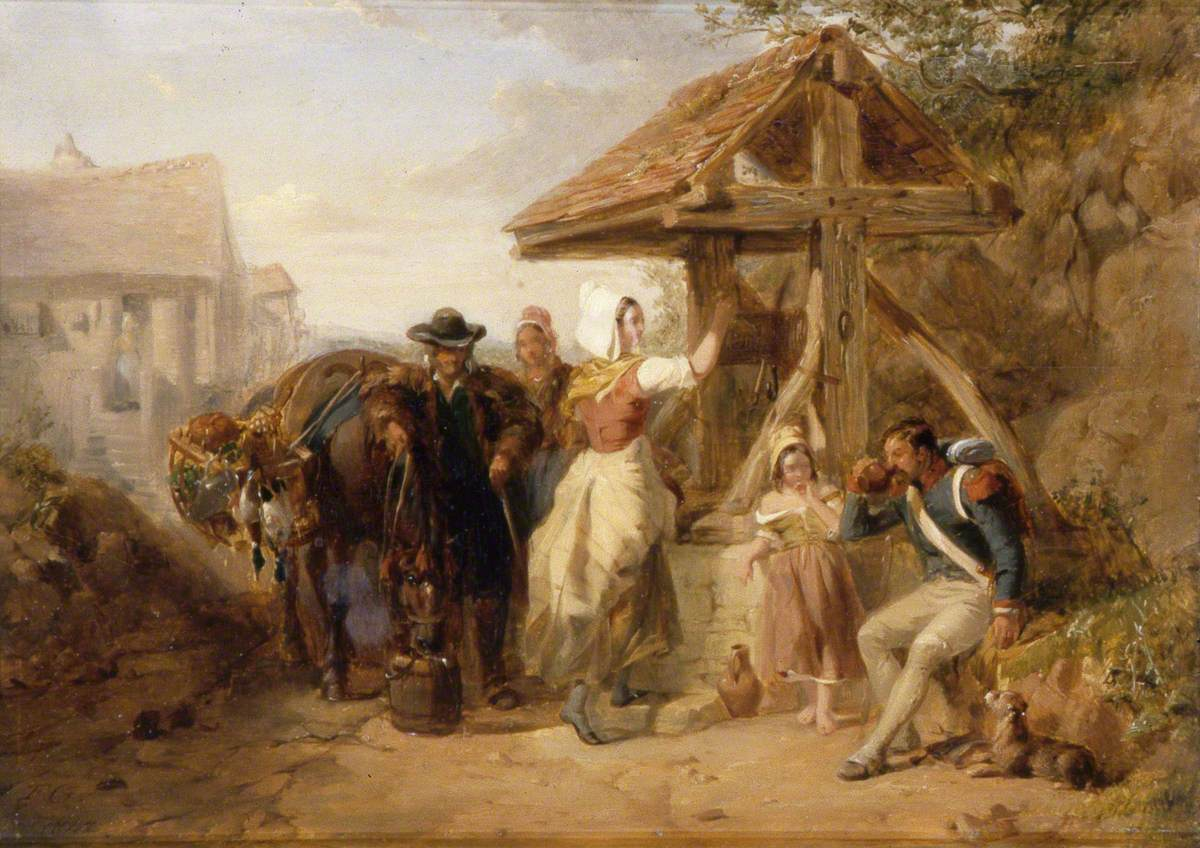
A Halt at a Brittany Well, 1844

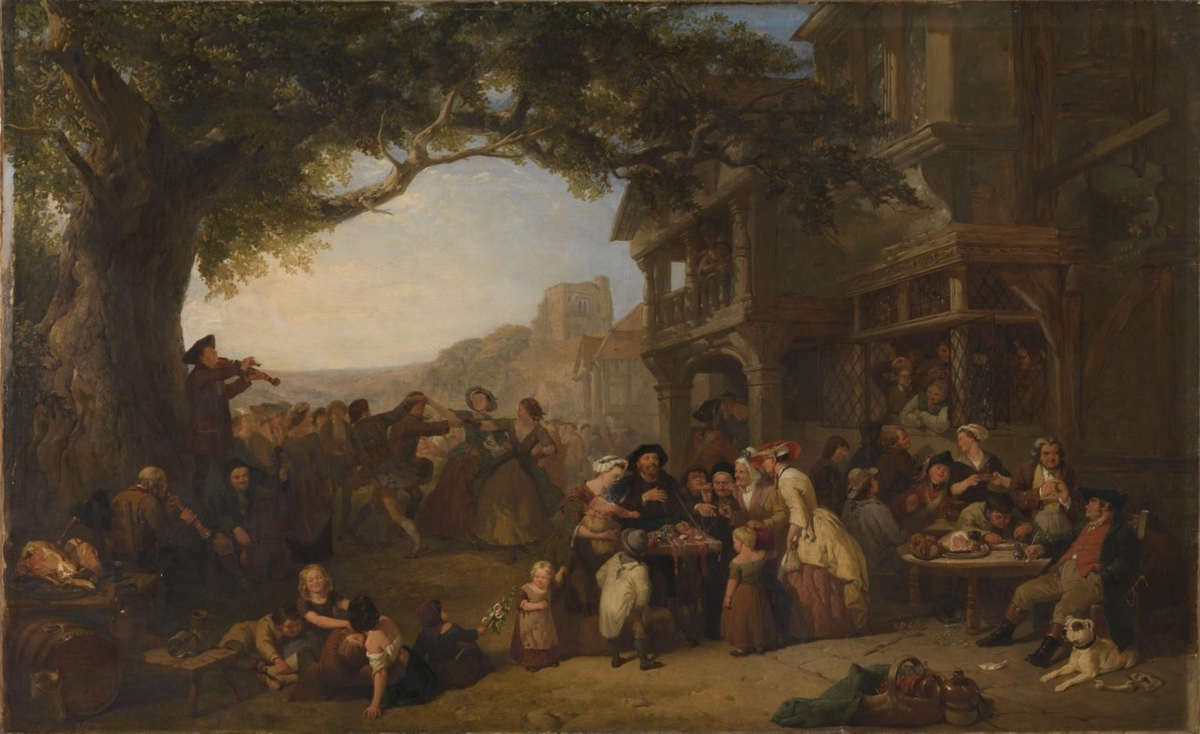
The Village Holiday, 1847

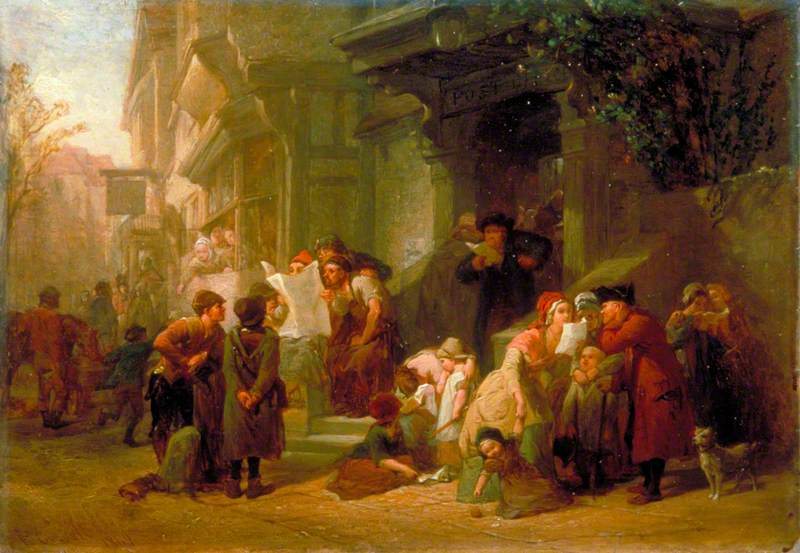
The Village Post Office, 1849

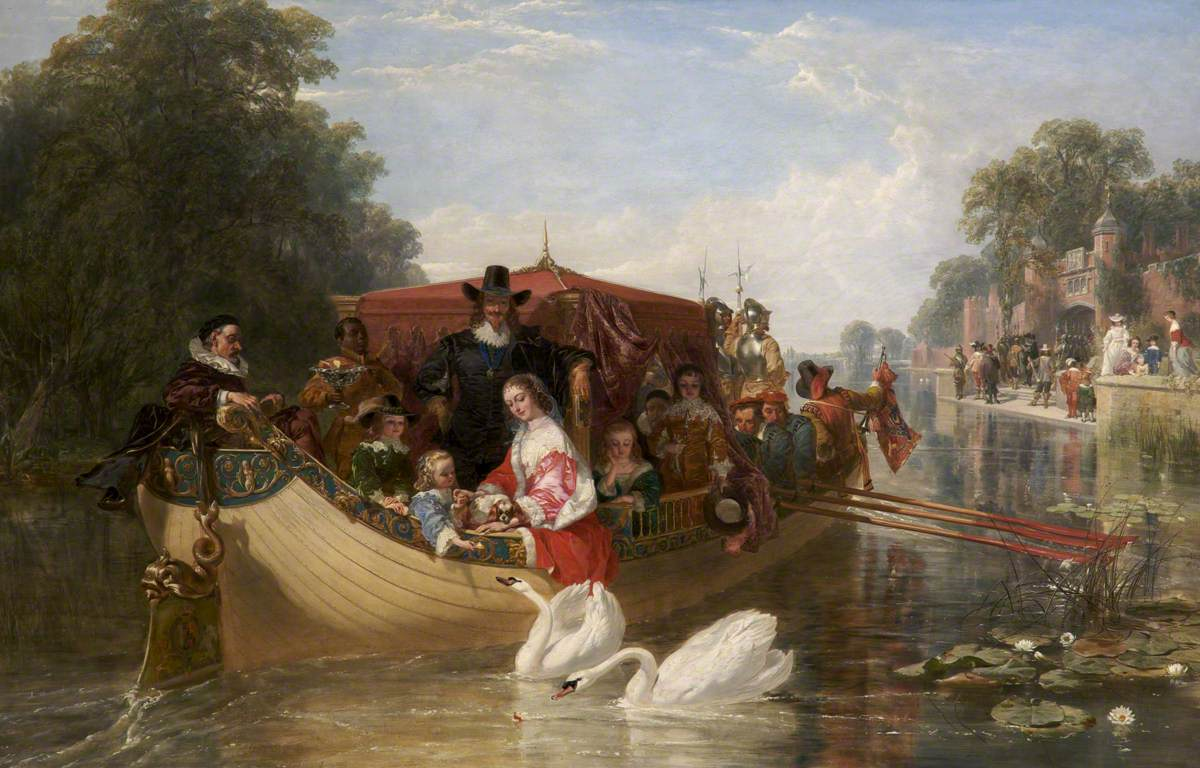
An Episode in the Happier Days of Charles I, 1853

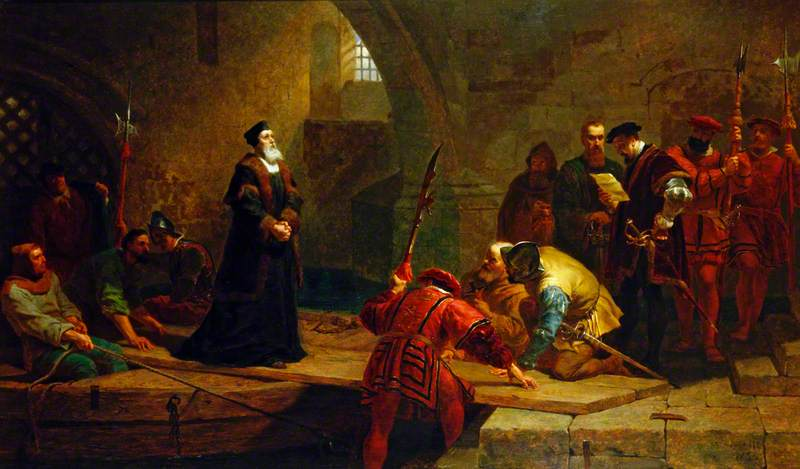
Cranmer at Traitor's Gate, 1856

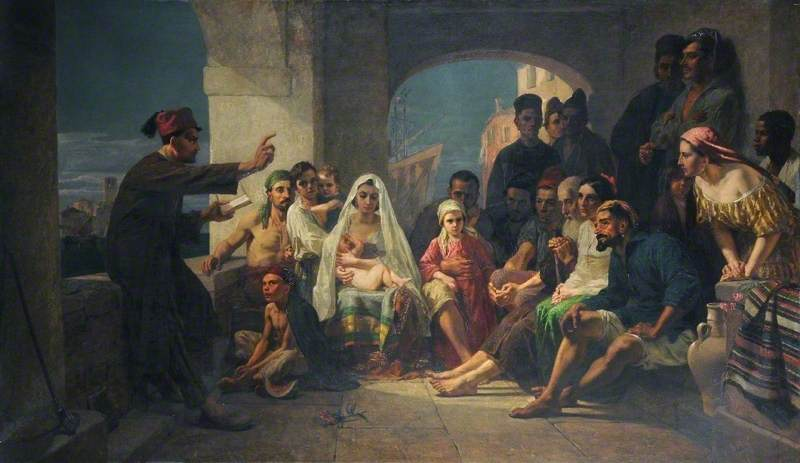
Felice Ballarin Reciting Tasso to the People of Chioggia, 1858

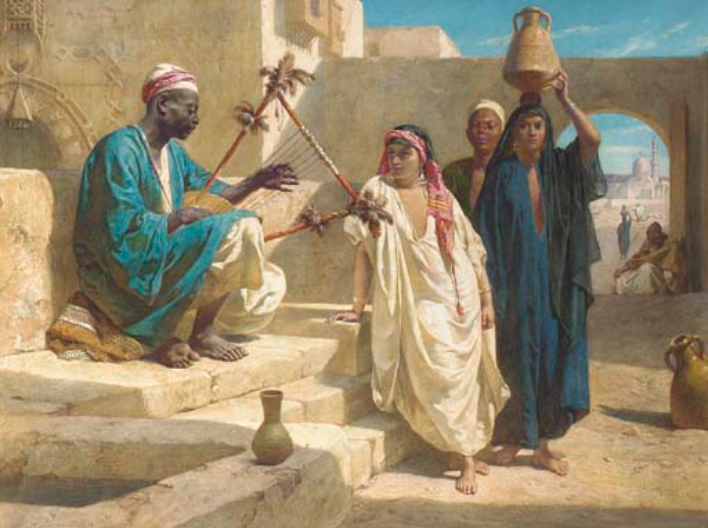
The street musician (also known as Song of the Nubian Slave) 1864

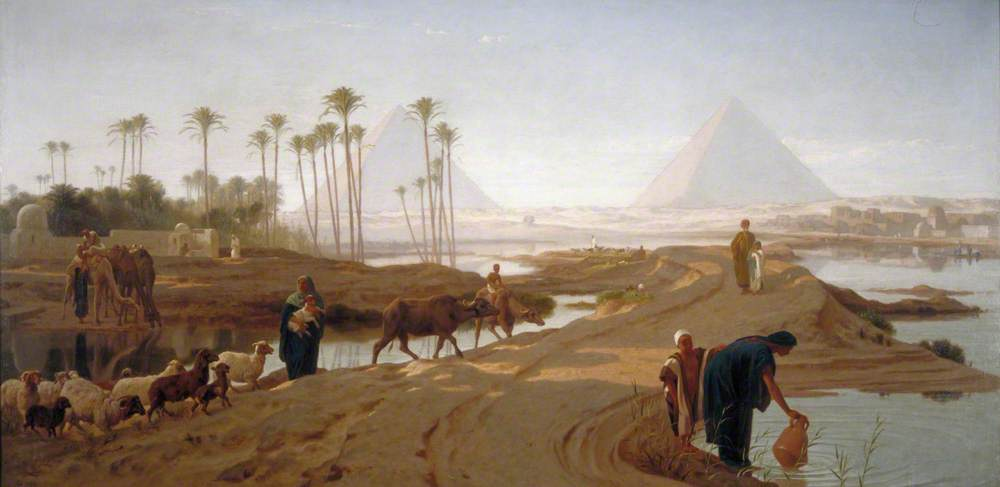
The Subsiding of the Nile, Egypt, 1873

Rachel and her Flock, 1874

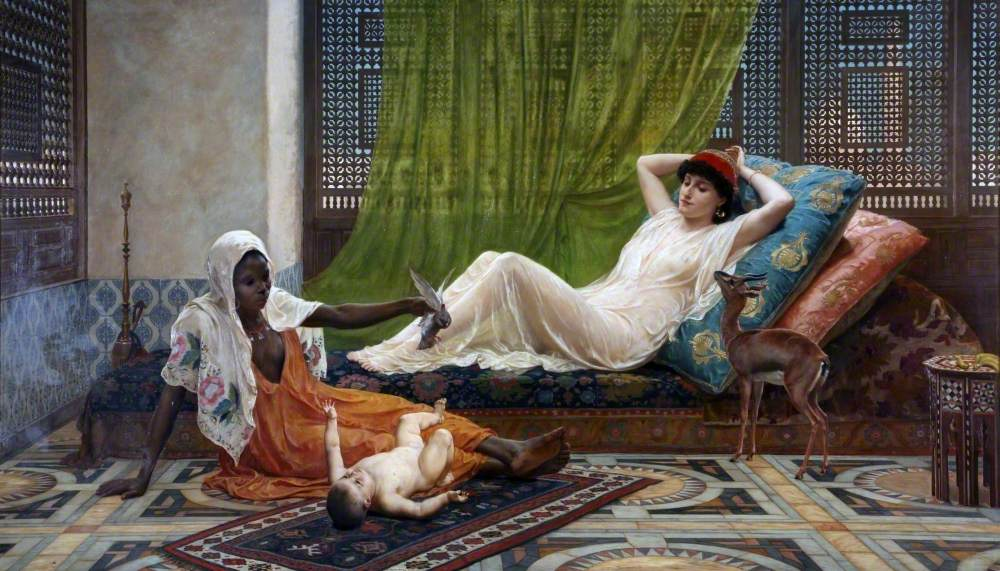
A New Light in the Hareem, 1884

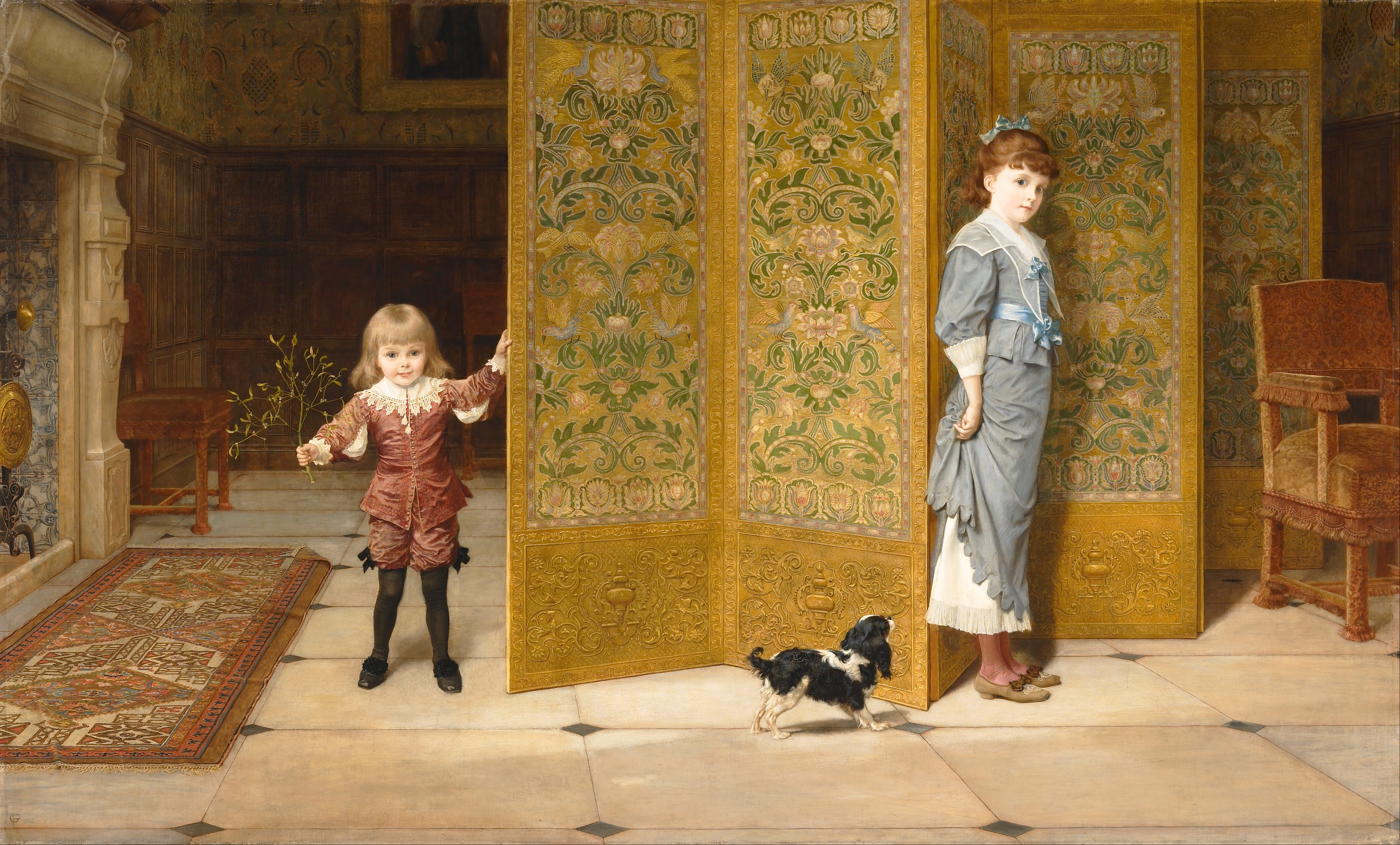
Puritan and Cavalier, 1886

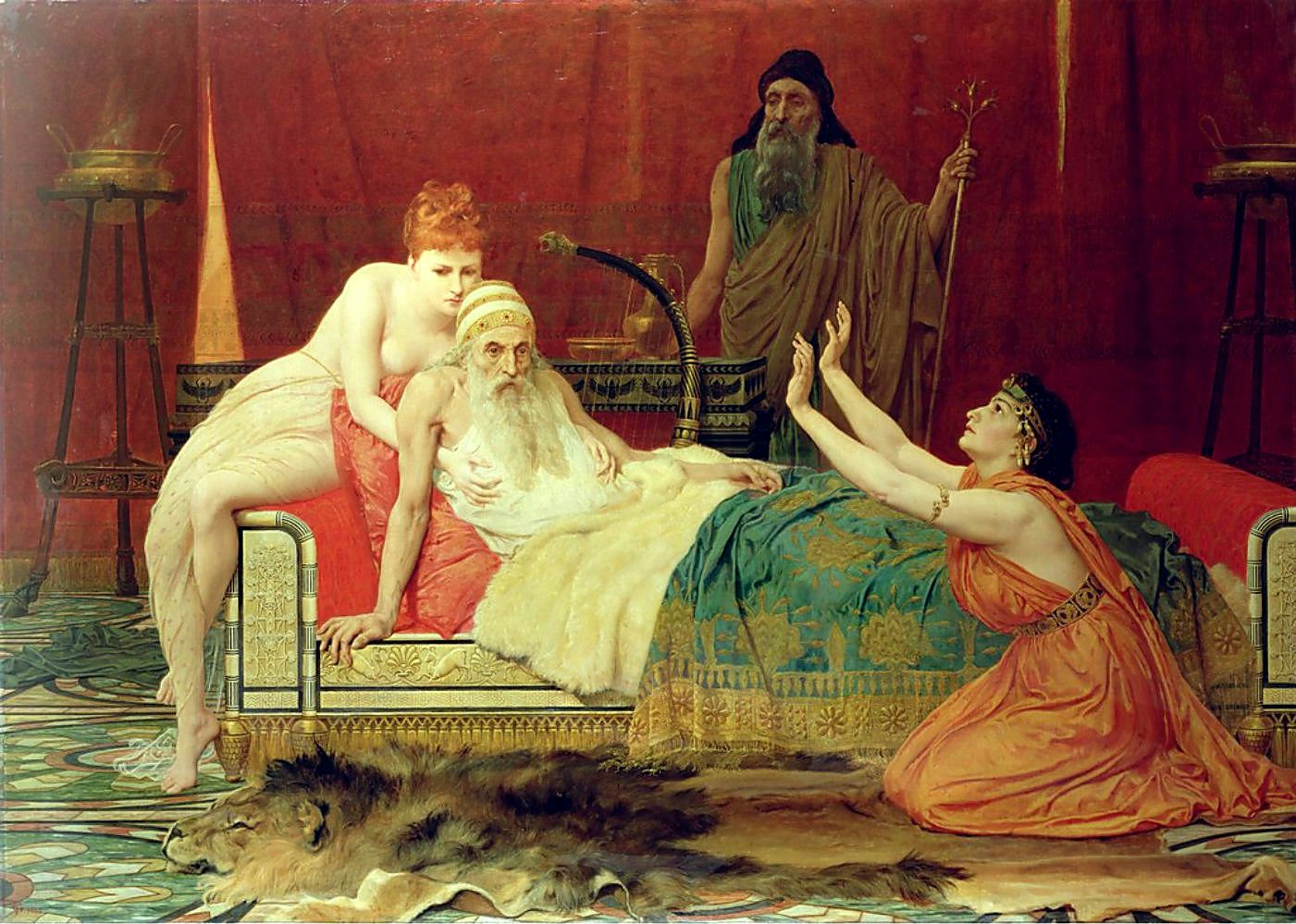
David, Bathsheba and Abishag

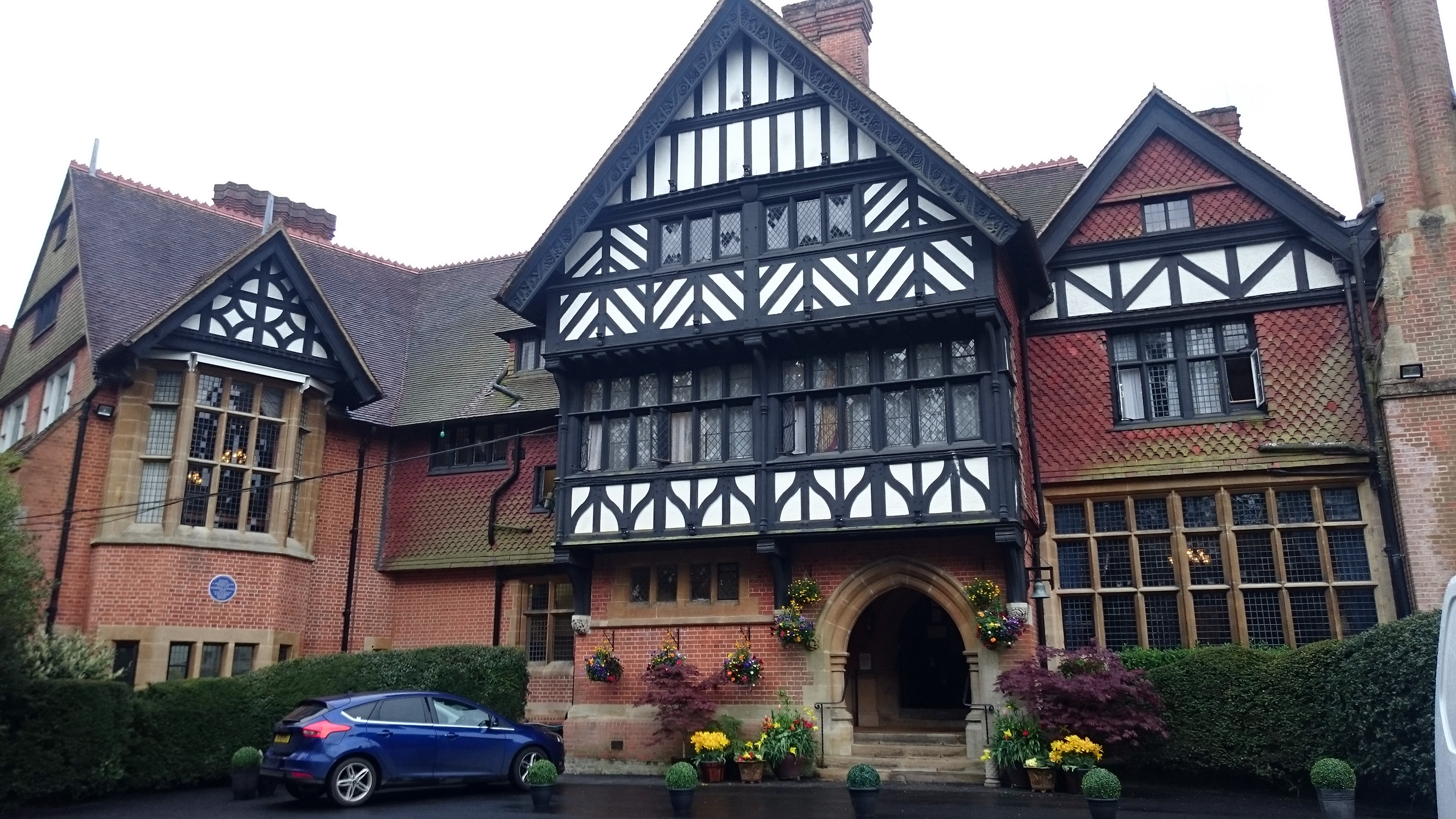
Grims Dyke, Harrow Weald, designed by Norman Shaw

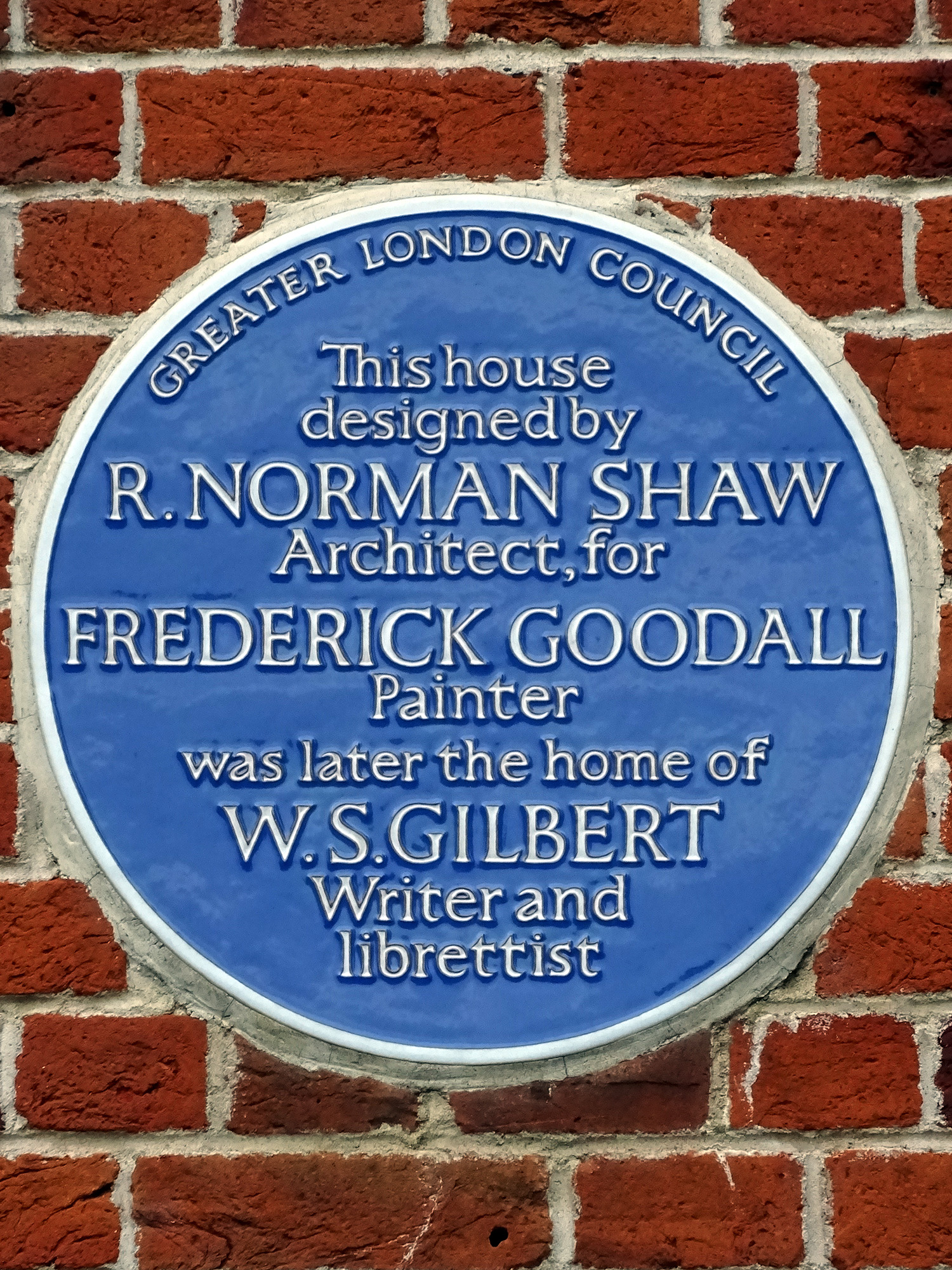
Blue plaque erected in 1976 at Grims Dyke

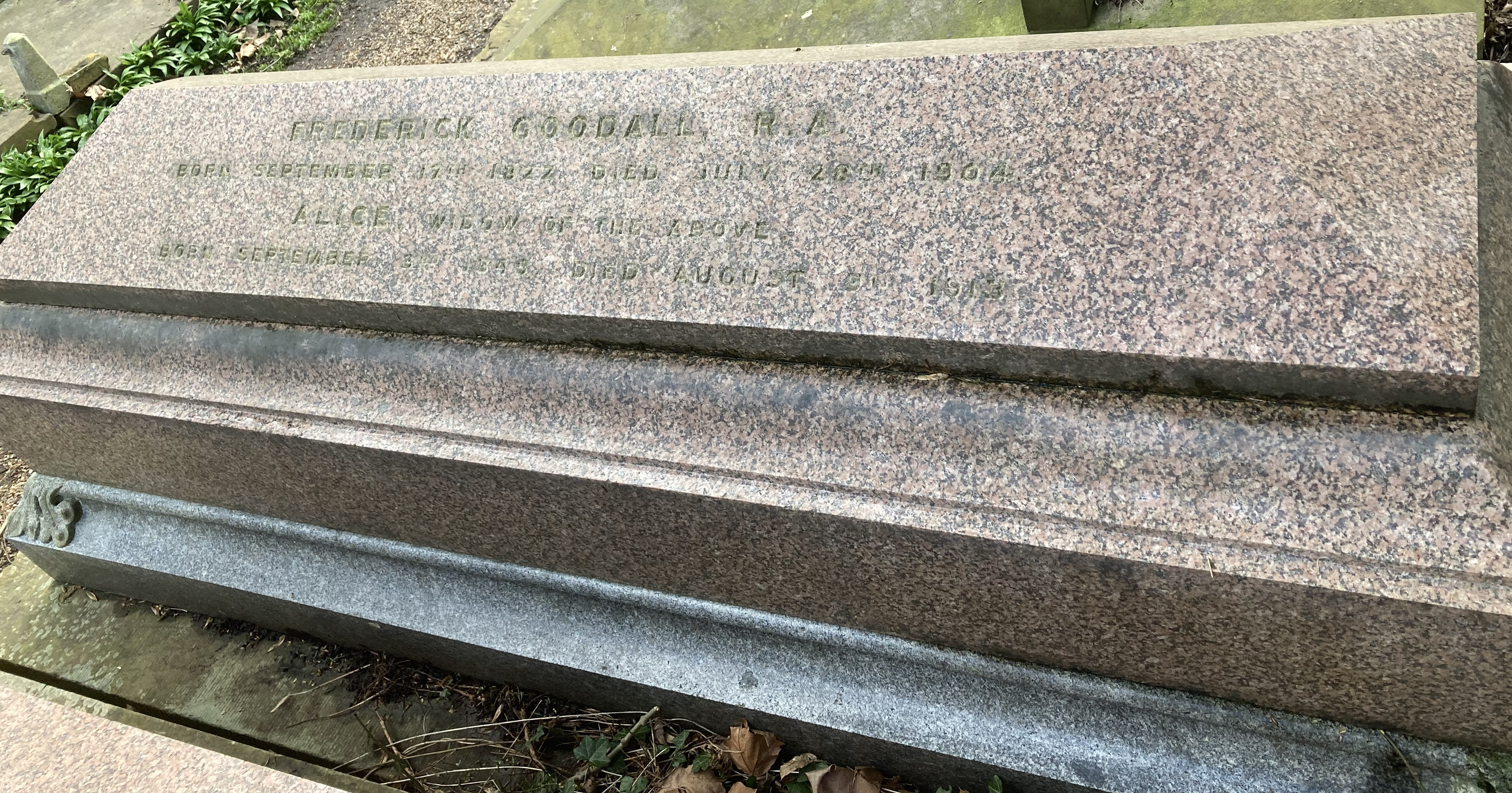
Family vault of Frederick Goodall in Highgate Cemetery

== See also ==
- Edward Goodall
- Edward Angelo Goodall
- Walter Goodall (painter)
