= Howard Goodall (painter) =

British painter

- Born: 1850
- Died: 17 January 1874 (aged 23–24); Cairo, Egypt
- Occupation: Painter

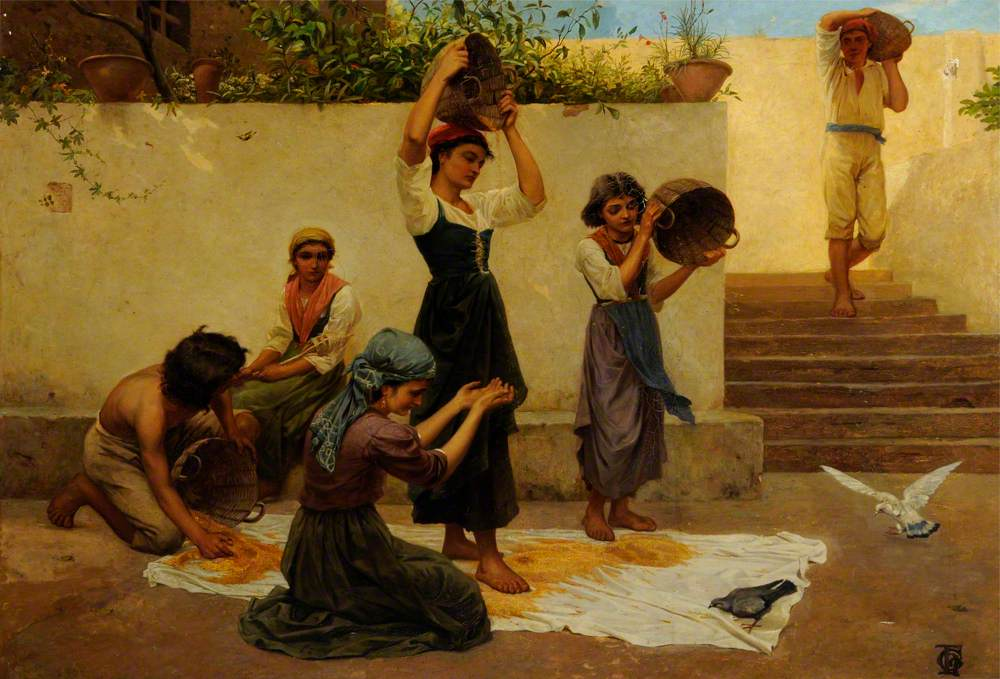
Capri Girls Winnowing Corn, exhibited 1872, Sheffield Galleries and Museums Trust

Howard Goodall (1850 – 17 January 1874) was a British painter. He was the second son of Frederick Goodall, R.A. He showed early promise as a painter. He exhibited at the Royal Academy in 1870, ‘Nydia in the House of Glaucus,’ and in 1873 Capri Girls Winnowing Corn. On 11 April 1871, in Capri, he accidentally shot and killed his brother Frederick Trevelyan Goodall.
