= Frederick Trevelyan Goodall =

British painter

- Born: 1848
- Died: 11 April 1871 (aged 22–23); Capri
- Occupation: Painter

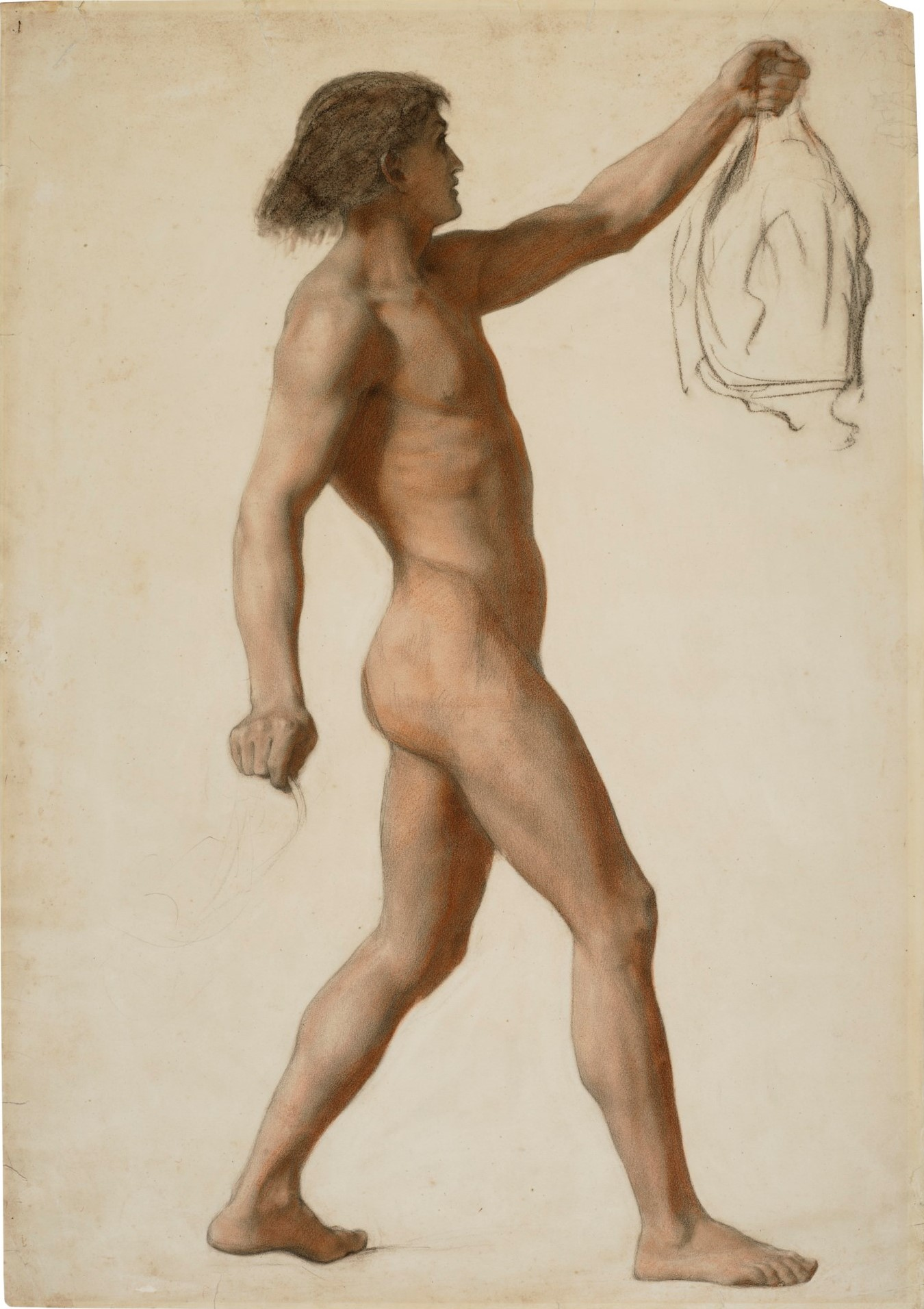
Nude study of a standing young man holding a head, [[{V&A]], chalk and crayon

Frederick Trevelyan Goodall (1848 – 11 April 1871) was a British painter. He was accidentally shot dead by his brother at the age of 23, cutting short a career of great promise.

== Biography ==
Goodall was the son of Frederick Goodall, R.A., was a student at the Royal Academy Schools. In 1868 and 1869 he exhibited some studies there, and in 1869 was successful in obtaining the gold medal of the Academy for an original picture, ‘The Return of Ulysses.’ He went to Italy, and seemed on the threshold of a successful career, but he died from a gunshot wound at Capri on 11 April 1871 after being accidentally shot by his brother Howard Goodall. He was 23 years old.
