= Edward Angelo Goodall =

English painter (1819–1908)

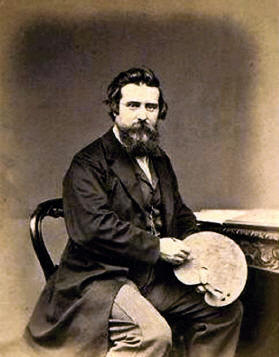
- Edward Angelo Goodall in the 1860s
- Born: 8 June 1819; England
- Died: 16 April 1908 (aged 88)
- Known for: Painter, watercolorist, draughtsman, illustrator
- Movement: Orientalist
- Father: Edward Goodall
- Relatives: Frederick Goodall, Walter Goodall, Eliza Goodall (sibling artists)

Edward Angelo Goodall RWS (8 June 1819 – 16 April 1908) was a British landscape and orientalist painter, a member of the Goodall family of artists.

== Early life ==
Goodall was the son of Edward Goodall, the engraver of J. M. W. Turner's works, and his brothers were the artists Frederick Goodall (1822–1904), a Royal Academician, and Walter Goodall (1830–1889). His sister Eliza Goodall (1827–1916) was also an artist. Edward Angelo was apprenticed to his father's office and his own artistic talents came to the fore in his teens when he won a silver medal, and praise from Clarkson Stanfield RA, at the Society of Arts for a picture of the landing of the Lord Mayor at Blackfriars Bridge. His work was exhibited at the Royal Watercolour Society.

== British Guiana ==
Moritz Richard Schomburgk was commissioned by the Prussian government to map British Guiana's boundaries, accompanied by his brother Robert, who was to collect natural history specimens for the Royal Museum and the Botanical Gardens in Berlin. Schomburgk was stricken by yellow fever shortly after his arrival in British Guiana. He and the expedition artist, W.L. Walton, returned to England. Goodall was chosen in 1841 as a replacement artist, receiving a salary of 150 pounds per annum and payment of his passage to Guiana.

Goodall was to sketch the people, landscape, plants and animal life. The botanical watercolours that Goodall had made were exhibited in Berlin, and the sketches of the indigenous tribes, in London and Paris. All the illustrations were later donated to the Colonial Office, made their way to the Department of Manuscripts at the British Museum, and are now at the British Library. The watercolours depict Guiana's indigenous peoples, some of whom are now extinct, and as such are an important ethnographical record. The paintings also feature topographical and botanical subjects. Some of Goodall's watercolours have been published.

Goodall also kept a journal whilst on expedition. This is also now at the British Library. The journal sheds light on colonial life in Georgetown, where Goodall had five months to kill before the expedition departed, as well as the expedition, its findings and dangers, the indigenous peoples, and the character and temperament of Schomburgk. Extracts from the journal have been published.

In 1845, George Bentham (1800–1884), named a plant species from Guyana, Goodallia guianensis Benth. in his honour.

== Return to Britain ==
After returning from Guiana in 1844, Goodall continued to exhibit his watercolours, chiefly at the Royal Society of Painters in Water Colours, to which he was elected a member in 1864, but also at the Royal Academy, the British Institution, and the Society of British Artists.

== Crimean War ==
In December 1854 Goodall was appointed war artist in the Crimea for the Illustrated London News. He witnessed the battles at the Alma and Balaclava, and the Siege of Sebastopol. A sketchbook from Goodall's time in the Crimea is at the British Library.

== Later life ==
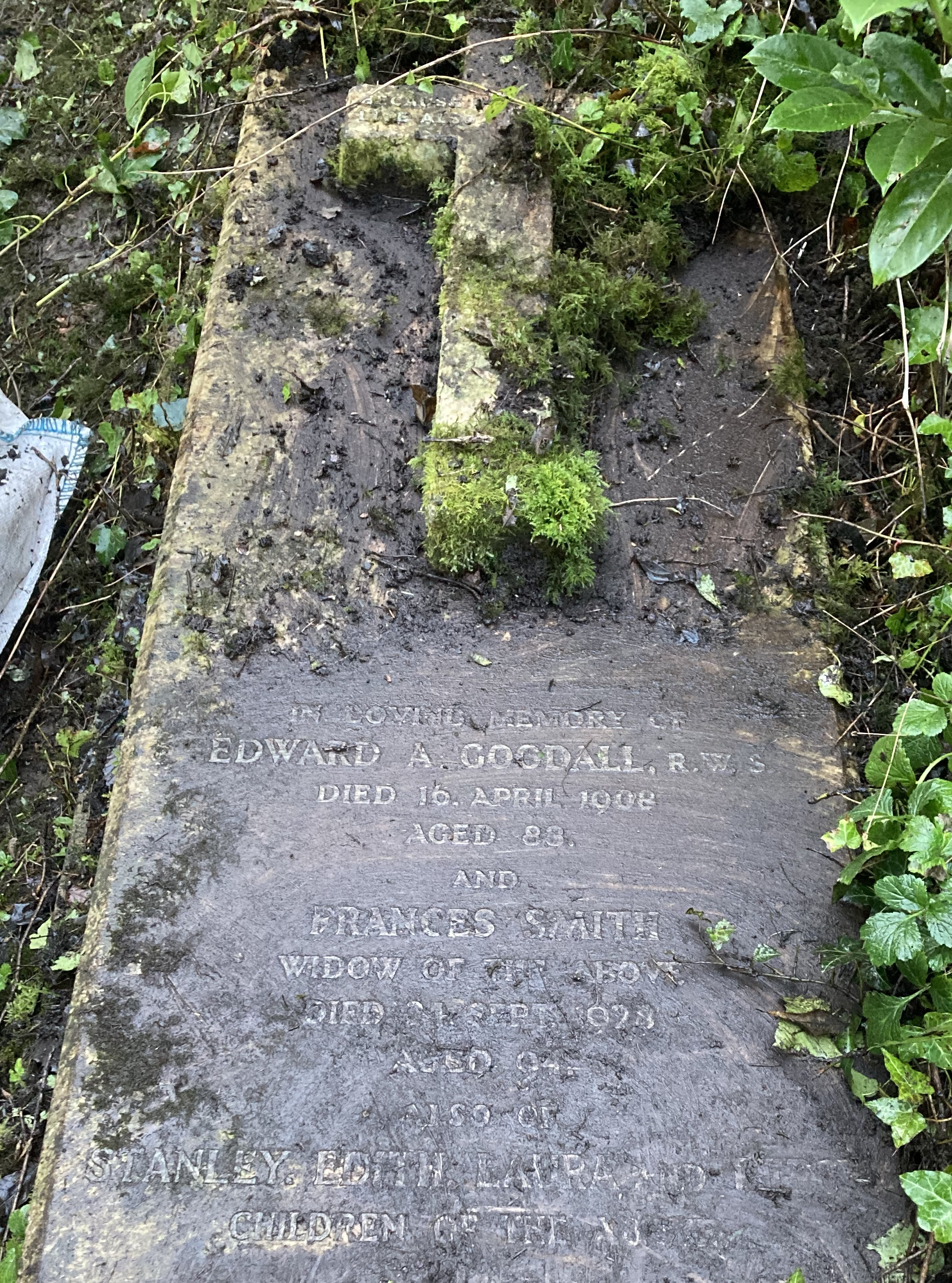
Family grave of Edward Goodall in Highgate Cemetery

After the Crimea Goodall travelled widely, visiting France, Spain, Portugal, Gibraltar, Egypt, Morocco, and Italy (including fifteen visits to Venice). Sketchbooks of some of his European travels are at the British Library.

He continued to exhibit his work in London, and by 1901 had exhibited 328 works at the Royal Society of Painters in Water Colours and thirty six at the British Institution.

Goodall died on 16 April 1908 and is buried on the western side of Highgate Cemetery, London.

== Gallery ==
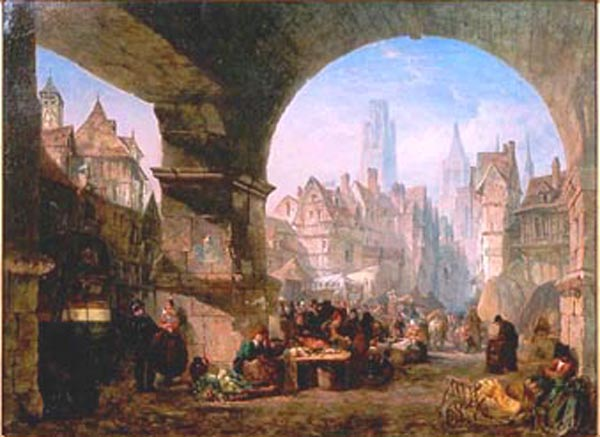
The Old Market, Rouen, France. 1848 Exhibited at the British Institution in 1849

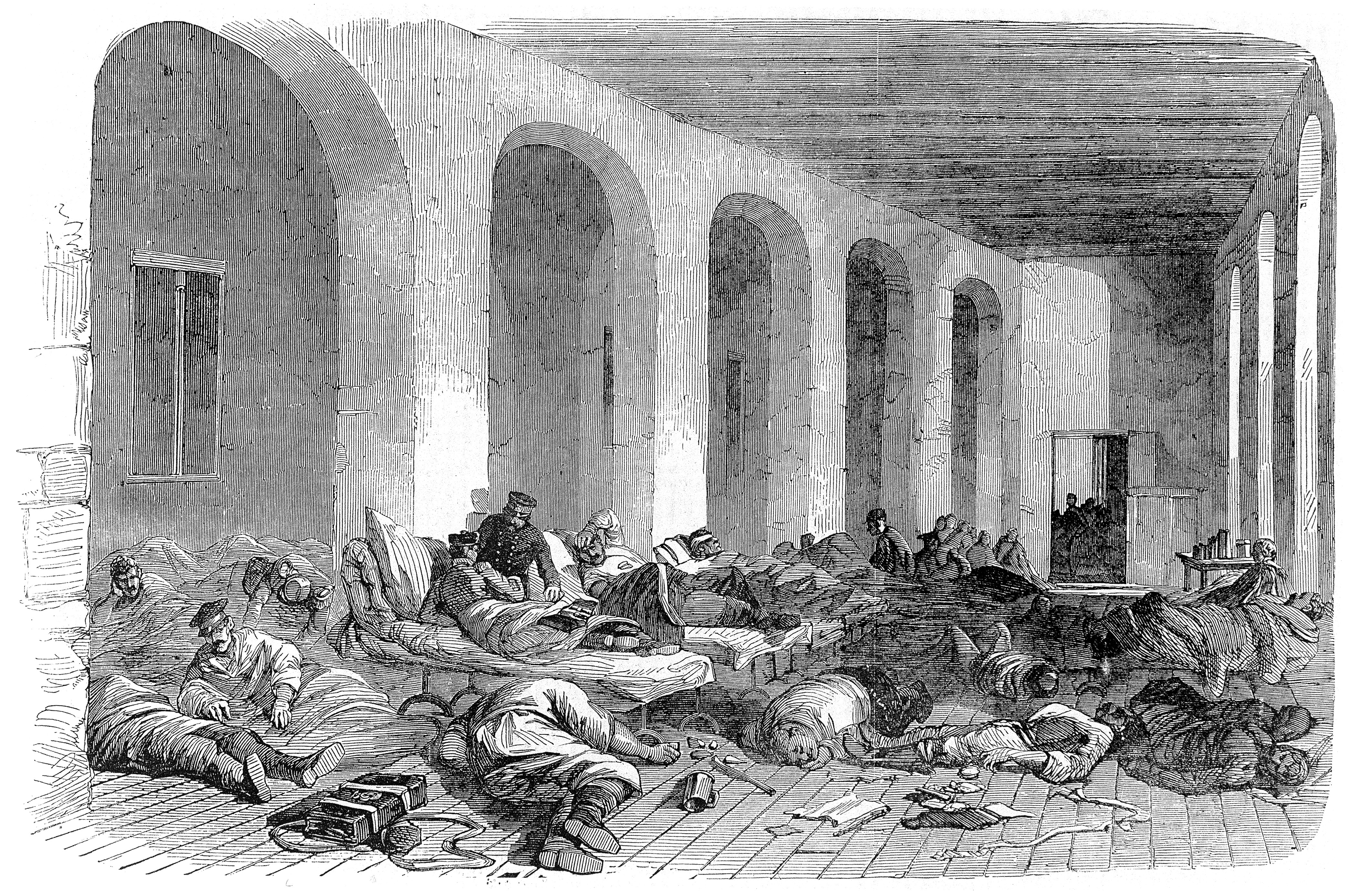
Hospital in Sebastopol. Dr. Durgan attending the wounded. The Illustrated London News, 6 October 1855

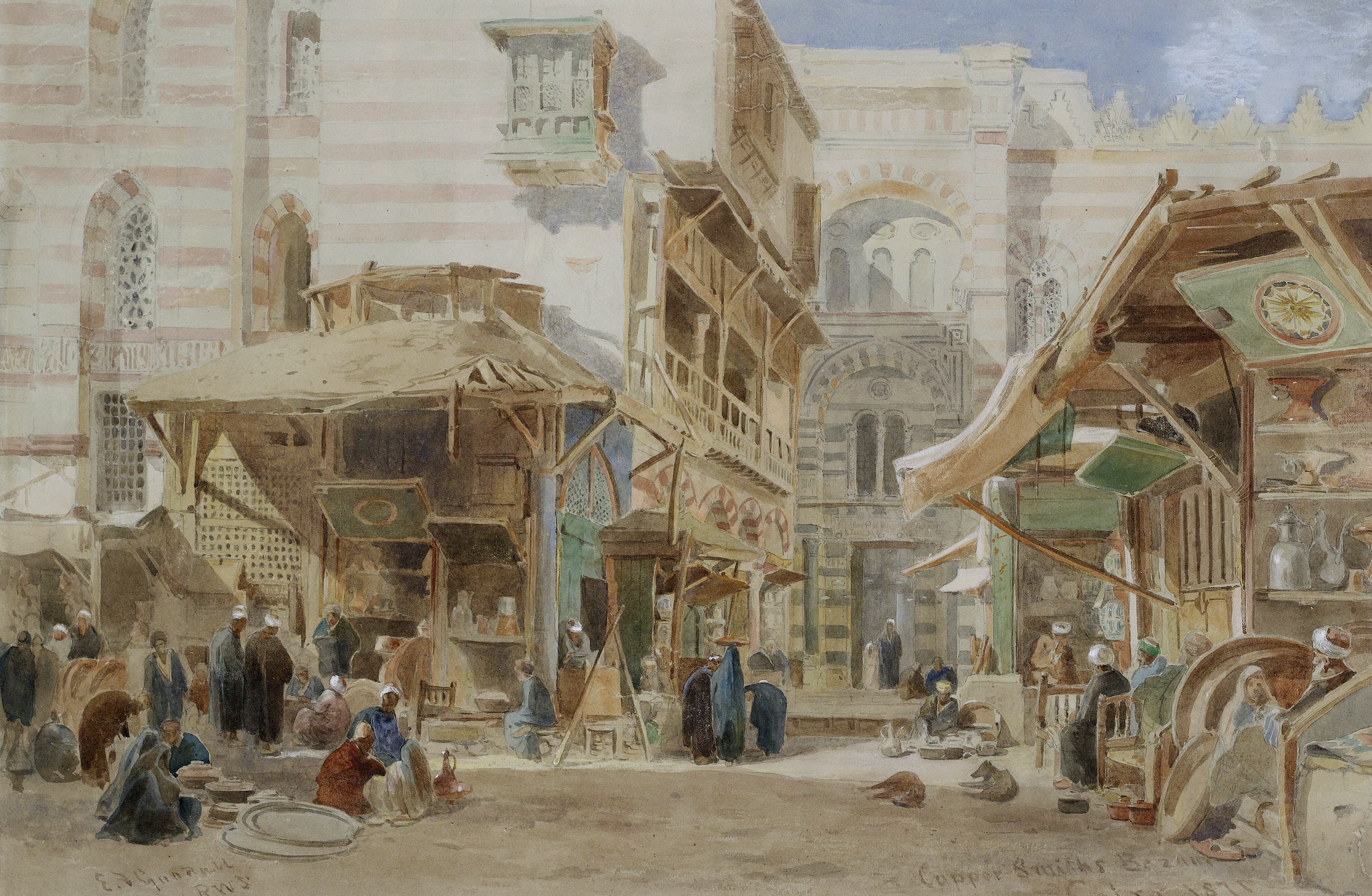
Copper Smiths' Bazaar - Cairo, 1871

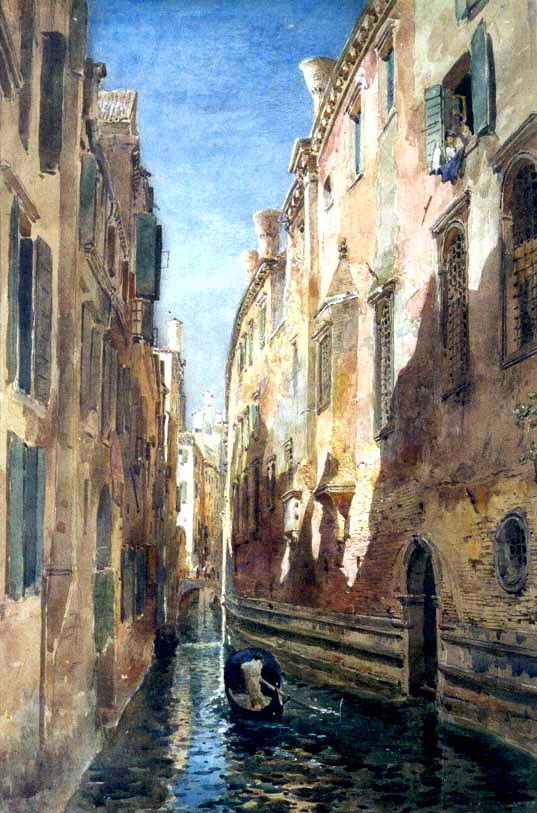
Canal Scene, Venice

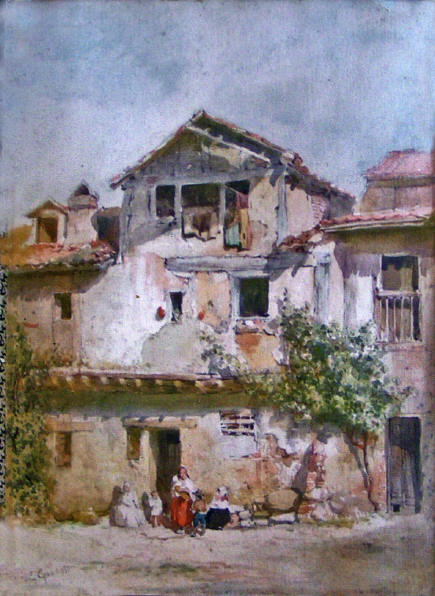
Buildings and Figures

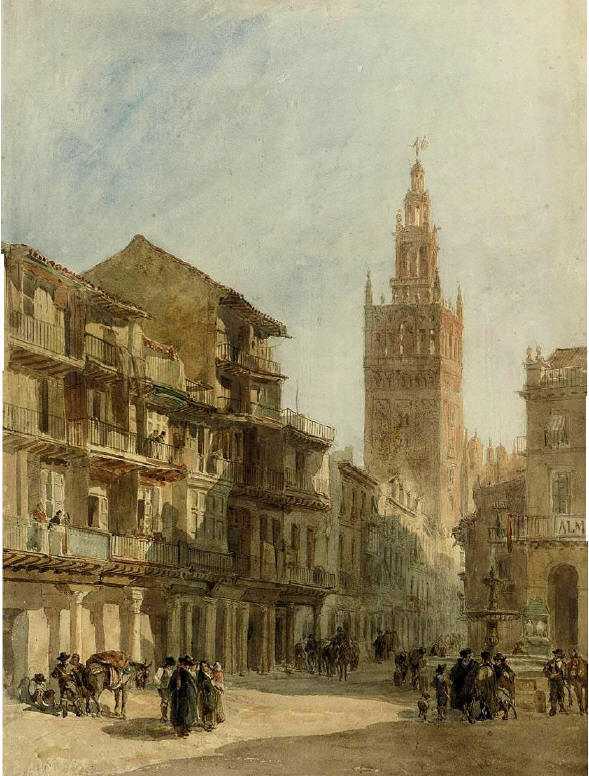
The Giralda, Seville

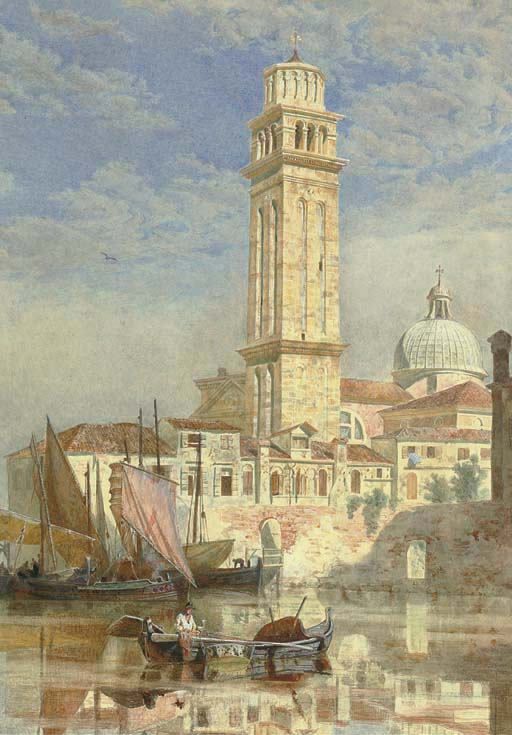
Church of San Pietro di Castello

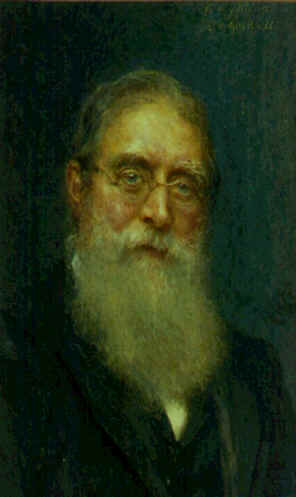
Self portrait

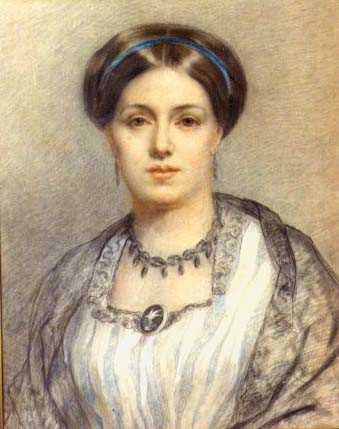
Frances Goodall (wife)

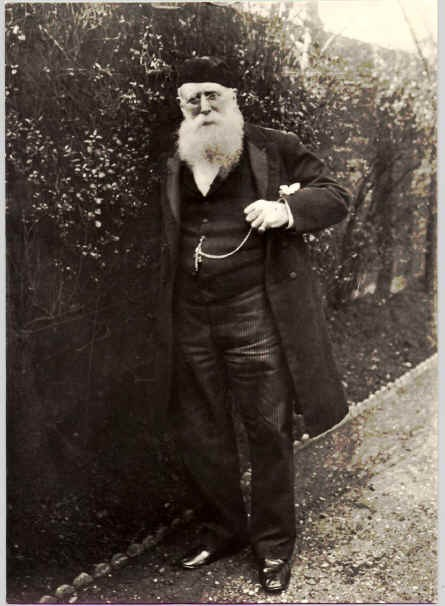
Goodall c.1890

== See also ==
- Edward Goodall
- Frederick Goodall
- Walter Goodall (painter)
- List of Orientalist artists
- Orientalism
