= Walter Goodall (painter) =

English painter (1830–1889)

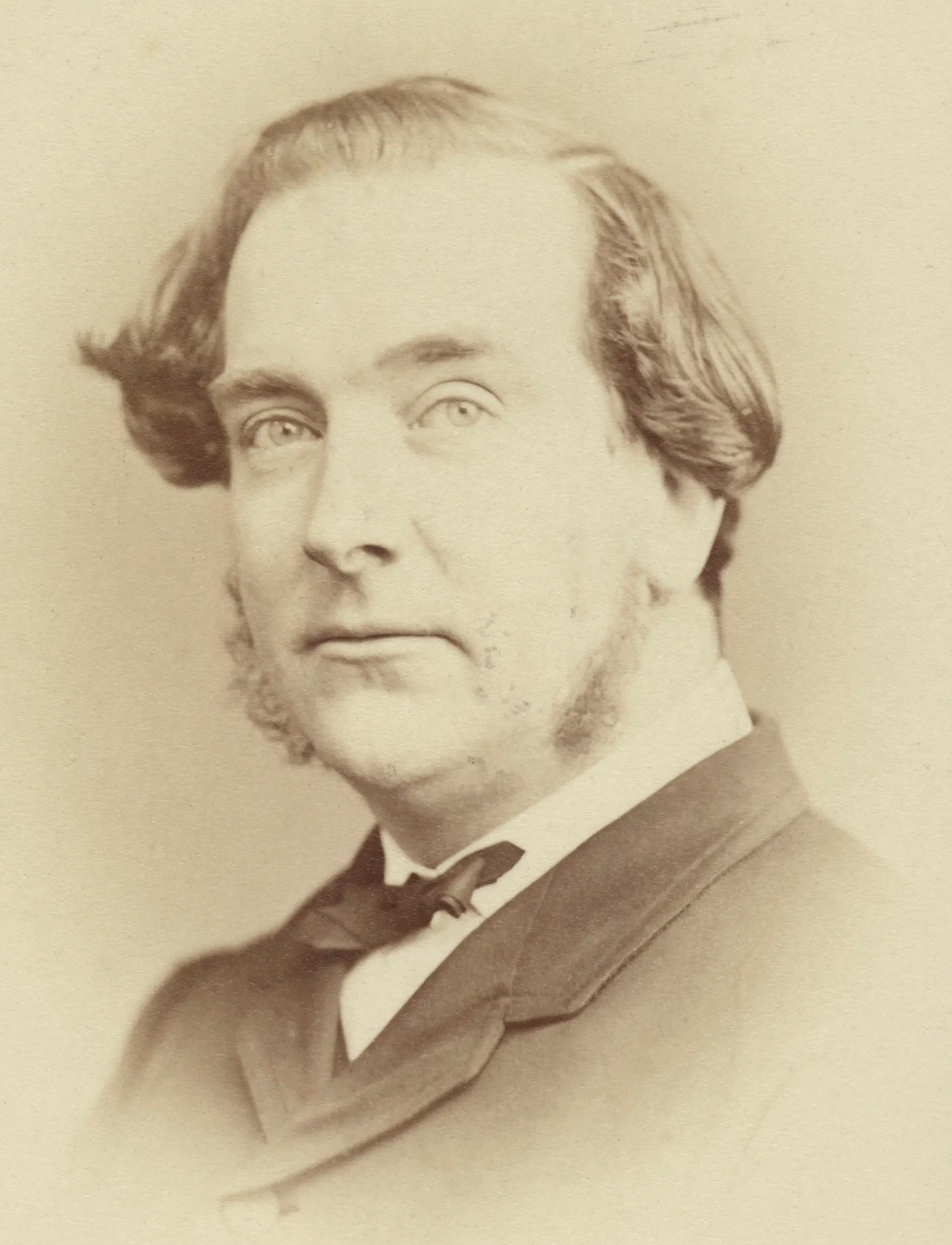
Carte-de-visite by Elliott & Fry, late 1860s

Walter Goodall (6 November 1830 – 14 May 1889) was an English watercolour painter.

Goodall typically painted small figure subject-pictures, such as The Daydream, The Cradle Song, Waiting for the Ferry-boat, and The Tired Lace-maker. Many showed scenes of cottage life with women and young girls. A number of these were lithographed in a series entitled Walter Goodall's Rustic Sketches in 1855-57. Goodall also made drawings from pictures in the Vernon Gallery for engravings published in The Art Journal, and painted some natural history subjects (plants, moths, marine life) for book illustrations.

In 1852 Goodall exhibited three drawings at the Royal Academy. In 1853 he became an associate of the (Old) Society of Painters in Water-colours, and continued to be a frequent exhibitor in Pall Mall; in 1862 he became a full member of that society. He was a constant exhibitor at the Royal Manchester Institution and all the principal watercolour exhibitions. Some of his best work was shown at the exhibition of watercolours at Manchester in 1861. His Lottery Ticket was exhibited at the Philadelphia Centennial Exhibition in 1876.

== Life ==
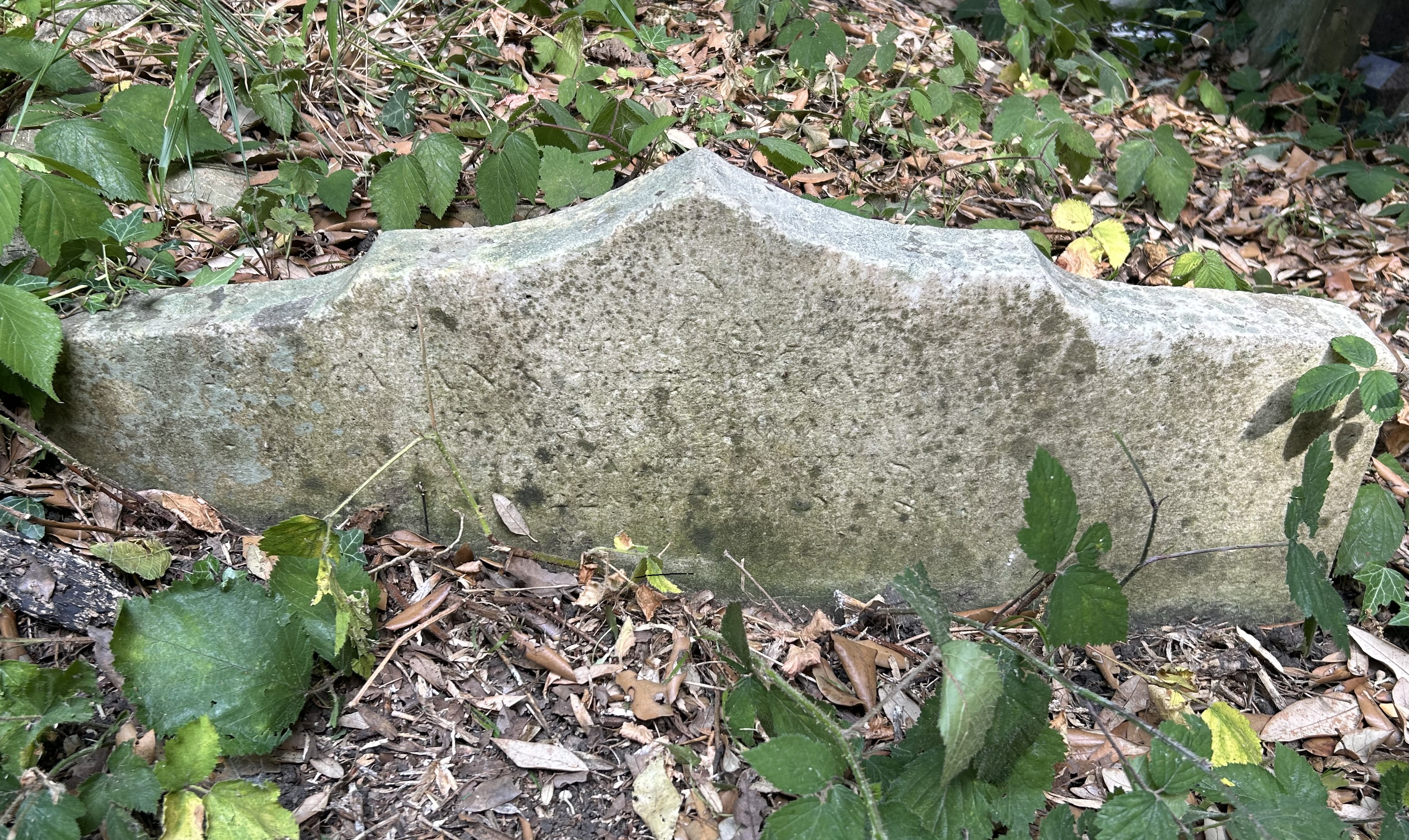
Grave of Walter Goodall in Highgate Cemetery

He was youngest son of Edward Goodall, the engraver, and brother of the watercolour artists Frederick Goodall and Edward Angelo Goodall. He studied in the school of design at Somerset House (forerunner of the Royal College of Art) and at the Royal Academy Schools.

He visited Italy in 1868-69, and perhaps again, seeing Rome and Venice.

About fourteen years before his death Goodall had a paralytic seizure, from which he never quite recovered, and during the last few years of his life was unable to practise his art. He died on 14 May 1889, in his fifty-ninth year, leaving a widow and three children, and was buried on the western side of Highgate Cemetery.

== Gallery ==
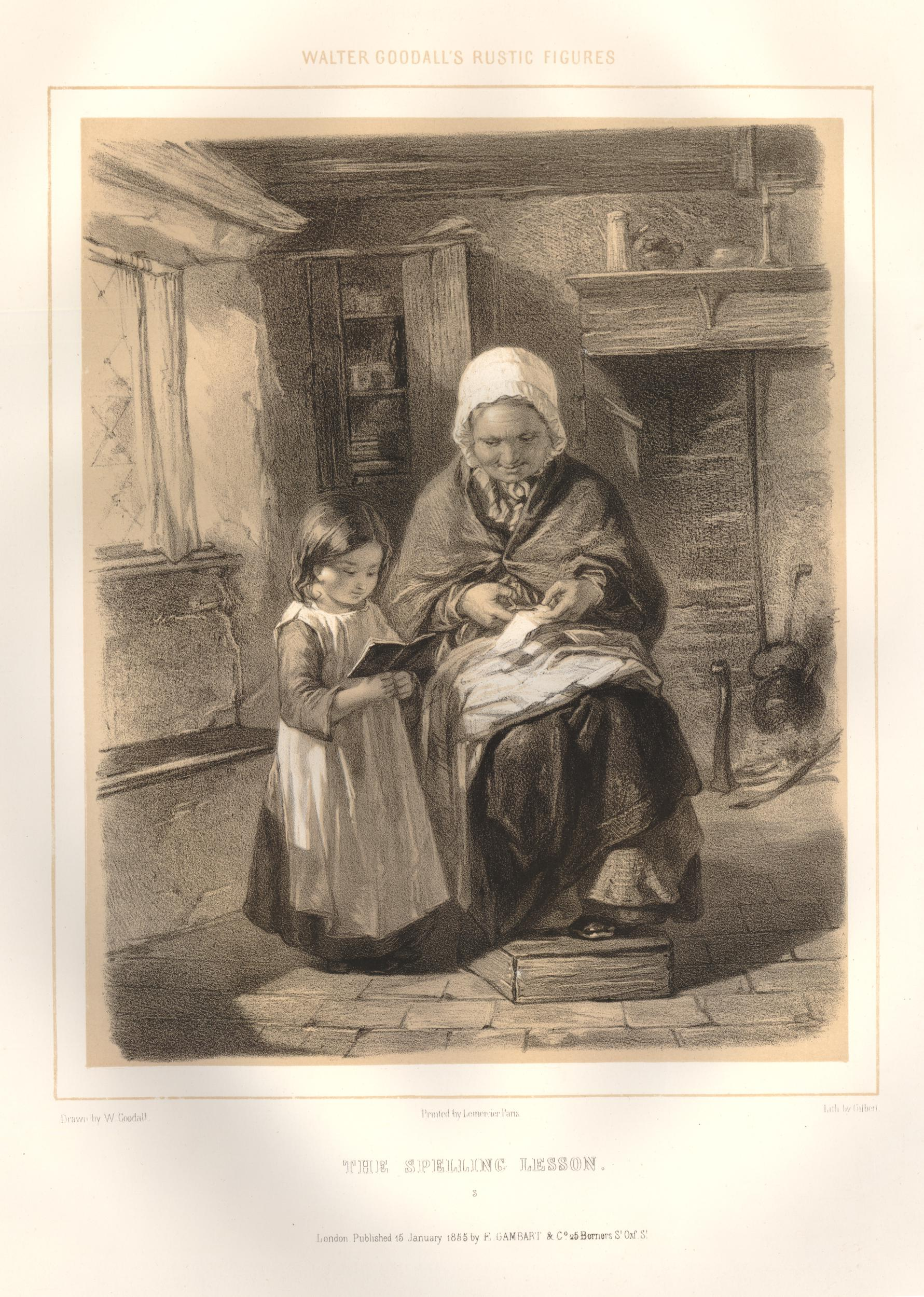
The Spelling Lesson (1855)

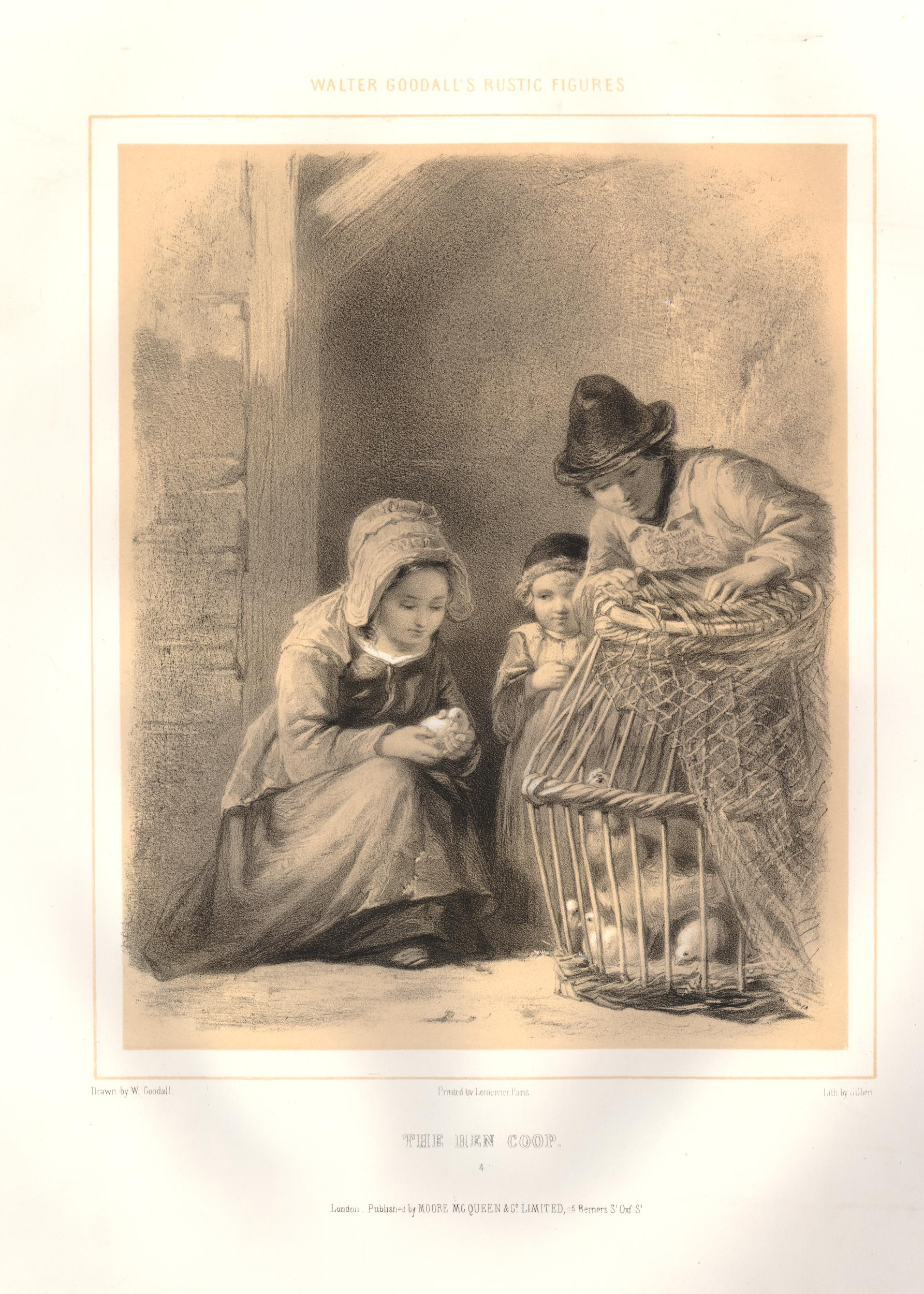
The Hen Coop (c. 1855–1857)

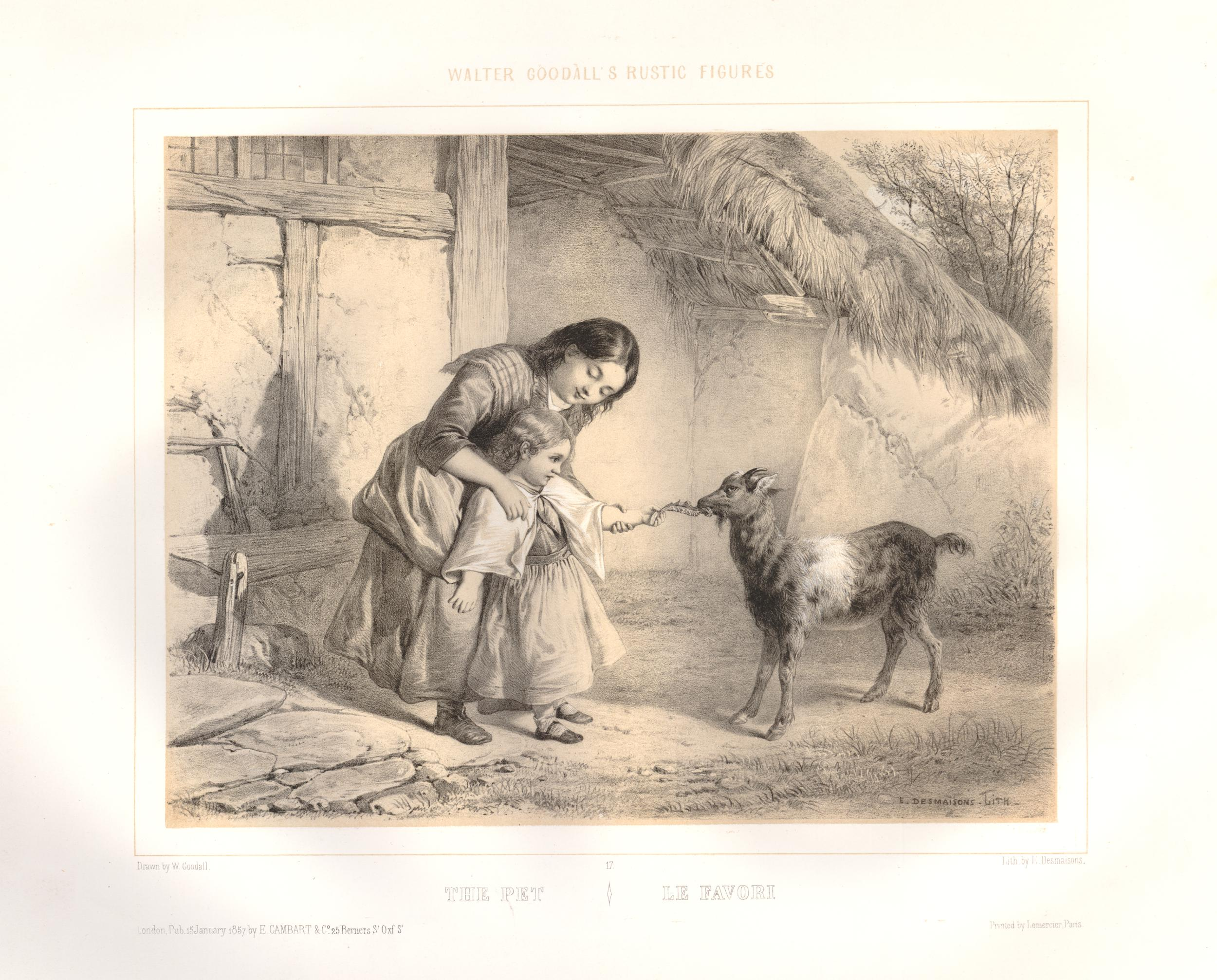
The Pet (1857)

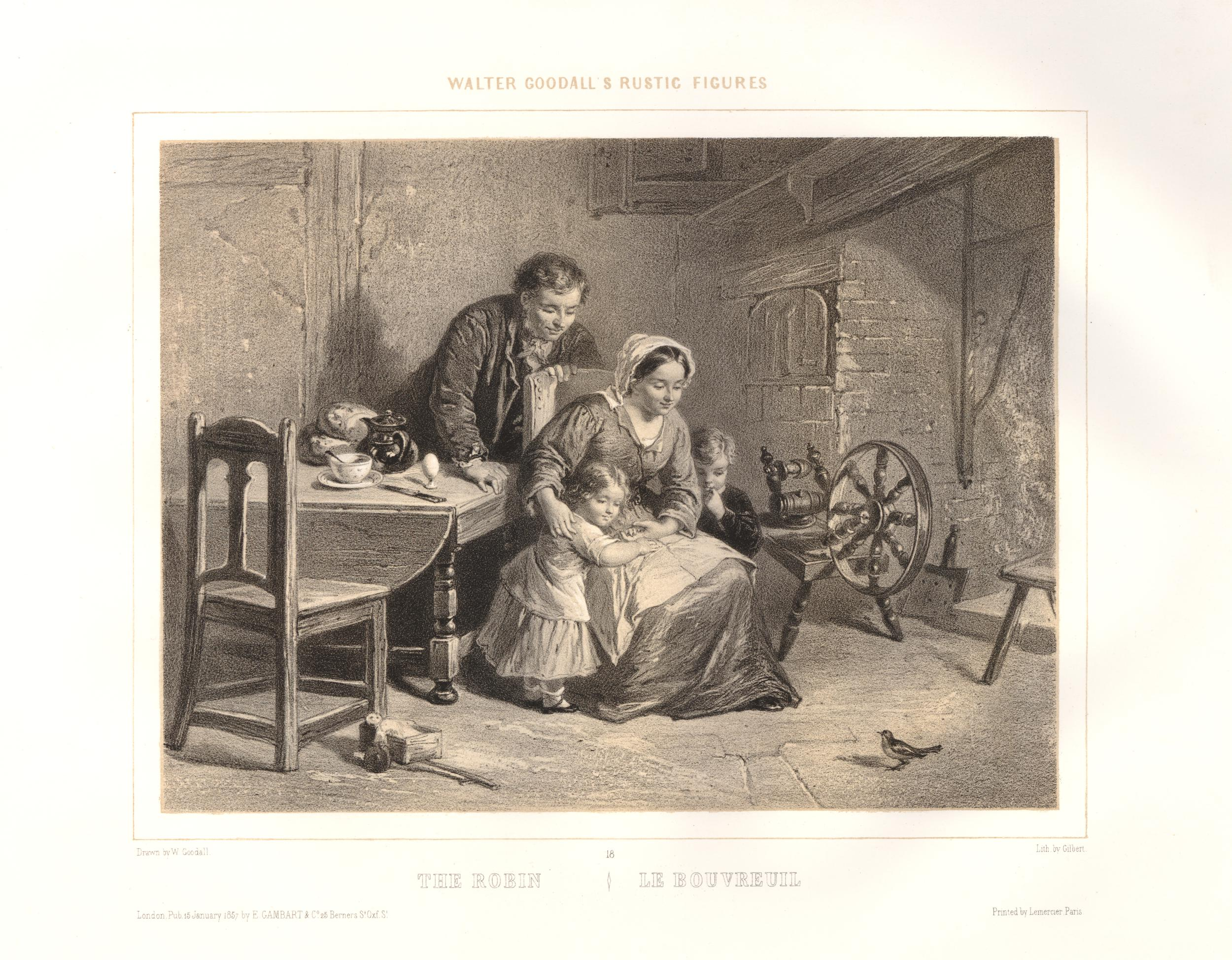
The Robin (1857)

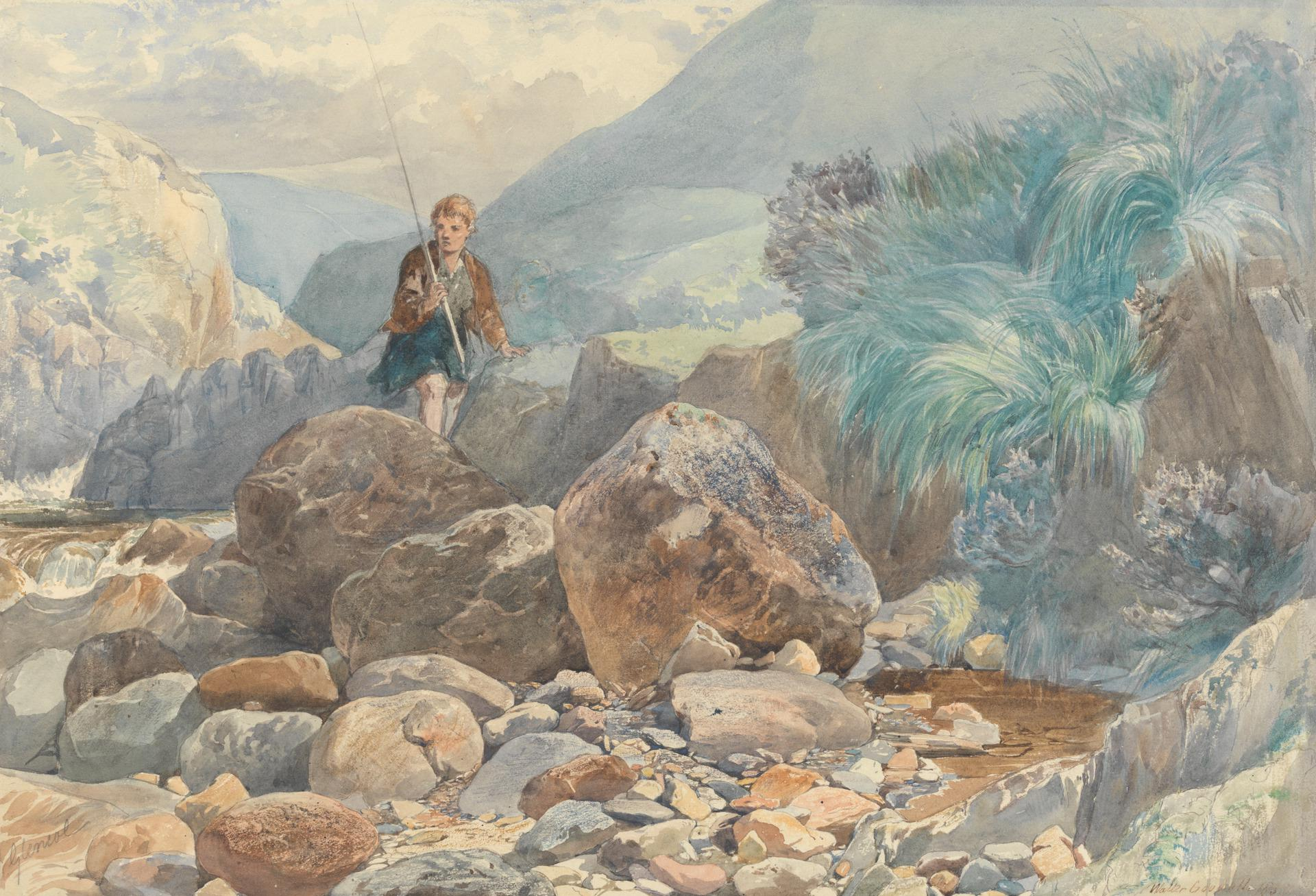
Glencoe, A Shepherd Boy Crossing a Burn, watercolour, 1857

== Notes ==
Attribution

This article incorporates text from a publication now in the public domain: Stephen, Leslie; Lee, Sidney, eds. (1890). "Goodall, Walter (1830-1889)". Dictionary of National Biography. Vol. 22. London: Smith, Elder & Co.
