= Edward Goodall =

British engraver (1795–1870)

Edward Goodall (1795 – 11 April 1870) was a British engraver. He is now best known for his plates after J. M. W. Turner.

== Life ==
He was born at Leeds on 17 September 1795, and was entirely self-taught. From the age of sixteen he practised both engraving and painting. One of his pictures exhibited at the Royal Academy in 1822 or 1823 attracted the attention of Turner, and he became a landscape engraver.

Goodall died at Hampstead Road, London, on 11 April 1870.

== Works ==
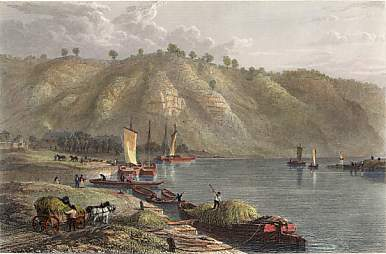
Karlshafen (1827), engraving by Edward Goodall after Robert Batty

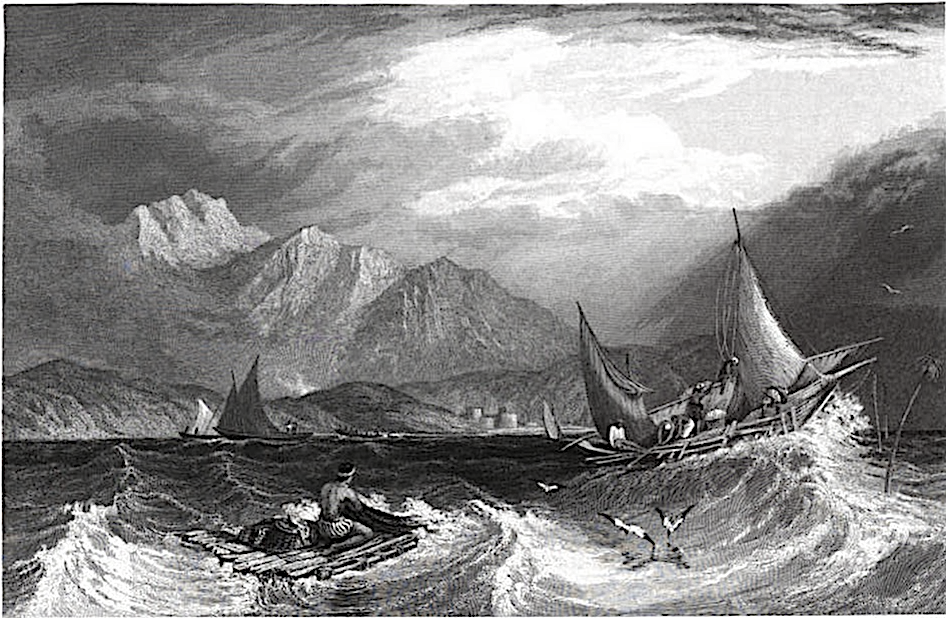
Bombay Harbour (1836), engraving by Edward Goodall after Clarkson Stanfield

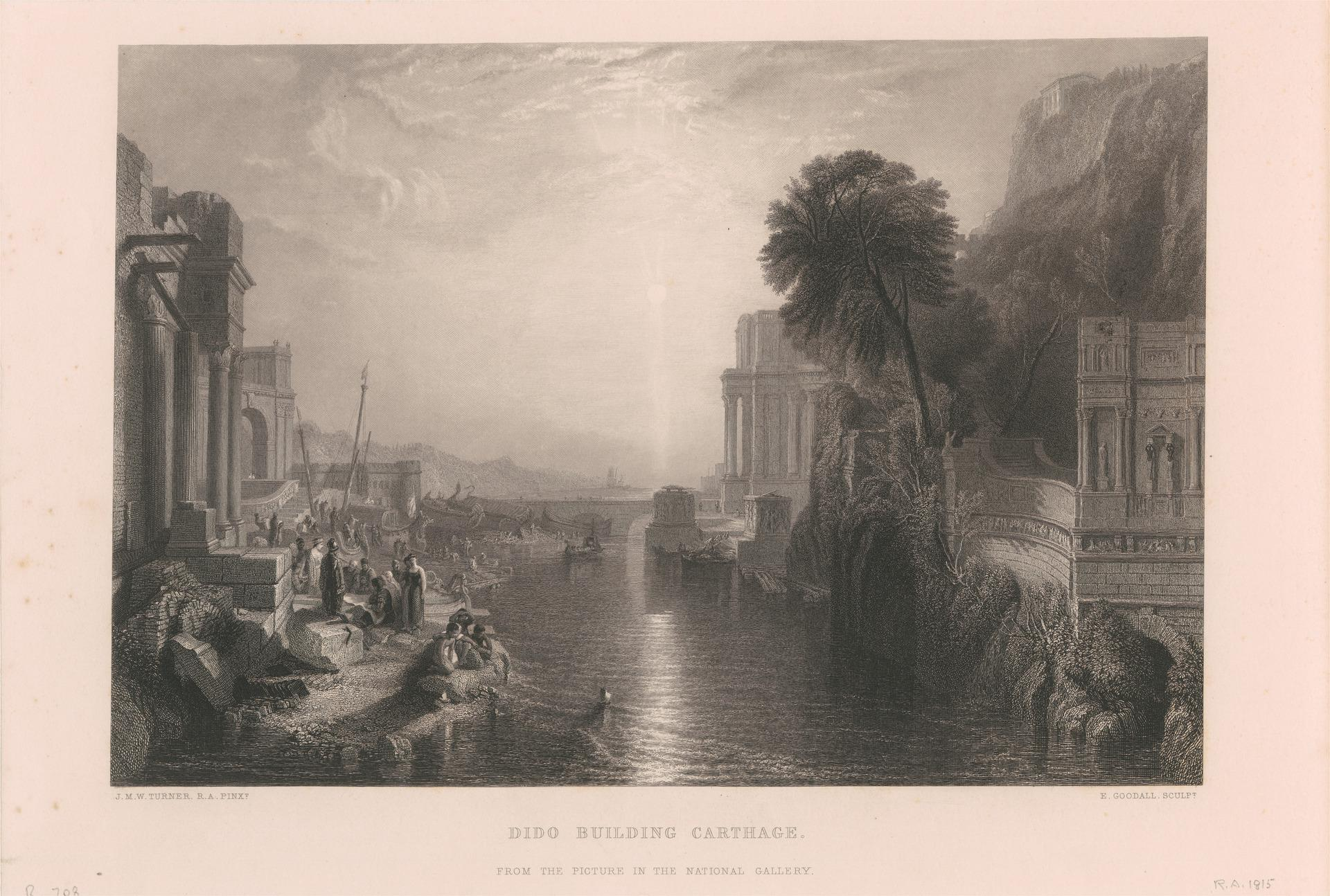
Dido Building Carthage (between 1859 and 1879)

Goodall's major engravings were from the works of Turner. He made the vignettes for Samuel Rogers's Italy and Poems, and the illustrations to Thomas Campbell's Poems. He engraved also:

- A Seaport at Sunset and The Marriage Festival of Isaac and Rebecca after Claude Lorrain;
- a Landscape, with Cattle and Figures, after Aelbert Cuyp; and
- The Market Cart after Thomas Gainsborough, these three for the series of Engravings from the Pictures in the National Gallery, published by the Associated Engravers;
- The Ferry Boat, after Frederick Richard Lee, for William Finden's Royal Gallery of British Art; and
- The Castle of Ischia, after Clarkson Stanfield, for the Art Union of London.

While landscape engraving was his speciality, he also executed figure subjects, some after the paintings of his son Frederick Goodall. Among those were The Angel's Whisper and The Soldier's Dream, The Piper (engraved for the Art Union of London), Cranmer at the Traitor's Gate, and The Happy Days of Charles the First, all after Frederick Goodall; and The Chalk Waggoner after Rosa Bonheur. He engraved some plates for The Amulet, and for The Art Journal.

== Family ==
Goodall left three sons, Frederick Goodall, Edward Angelo Goodall, and Walter Goodall, all members of the Royal Society of Painters in Water-Colours. His daughter, Eliza Goodall, married name Wild, exhibited at the Royal Academy and British Institution between 1846 and 1855.

== Notes ==
Attribution

This article incorporates text from a publication now in the public domain: Stephen, Leslie; Lee, Sidney, eds. (1890). "Goodall, Edward". Dictionary of National Biography. Vol. 22. London: Smith, Elder & Co.
