= Jones Bequest =

Collection of artwork in London

The Jones Bequest was a major donation of decorative arts, furniture and paintings bequeathed by the British art collector John Jones in 1882. Jones had made a fortune as a military contractor supplying tailoring to the British Army. He had a particular interest in eighteenth century French rococo style and amassed a large amount of originals for his Piccadilly townhouse, second only to the Wallace Collection. At his death in 1882 he left his collection to the Victoria and Albert Museum in South Kensington. In addition his collection featured a number of nineteenth century artworks by figures such as Edwin Landseer and William Powell Frith.

== Gallery ==
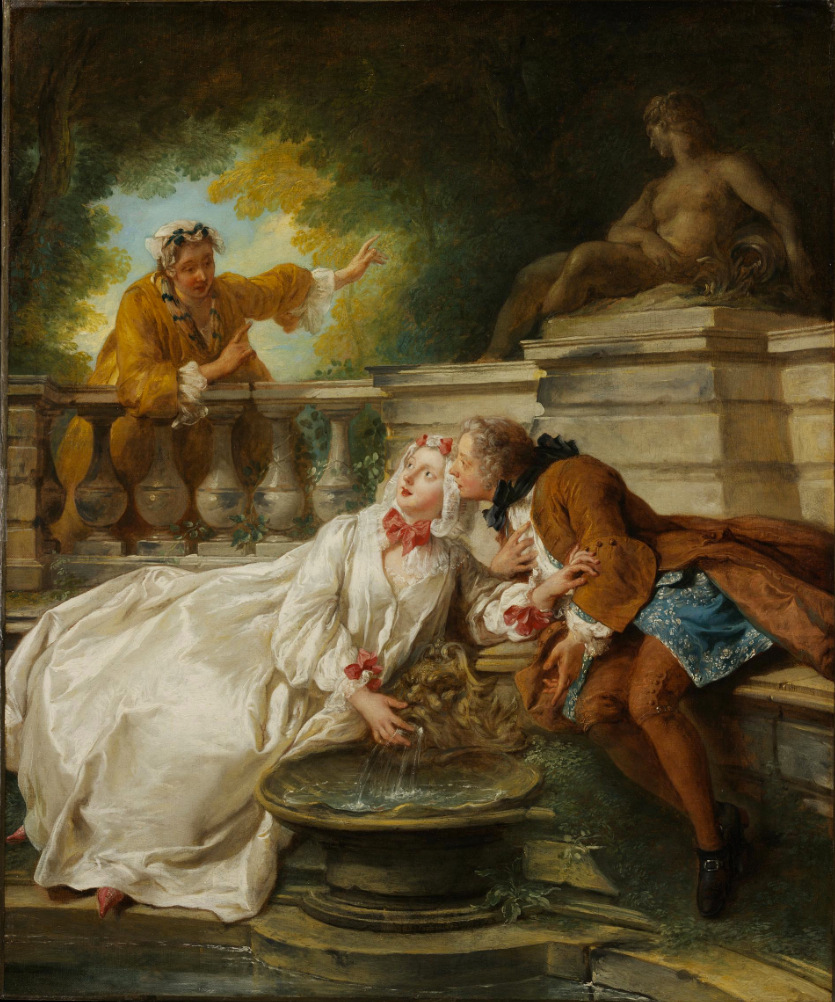
The Alarm by Jean-François de Troy, 1723

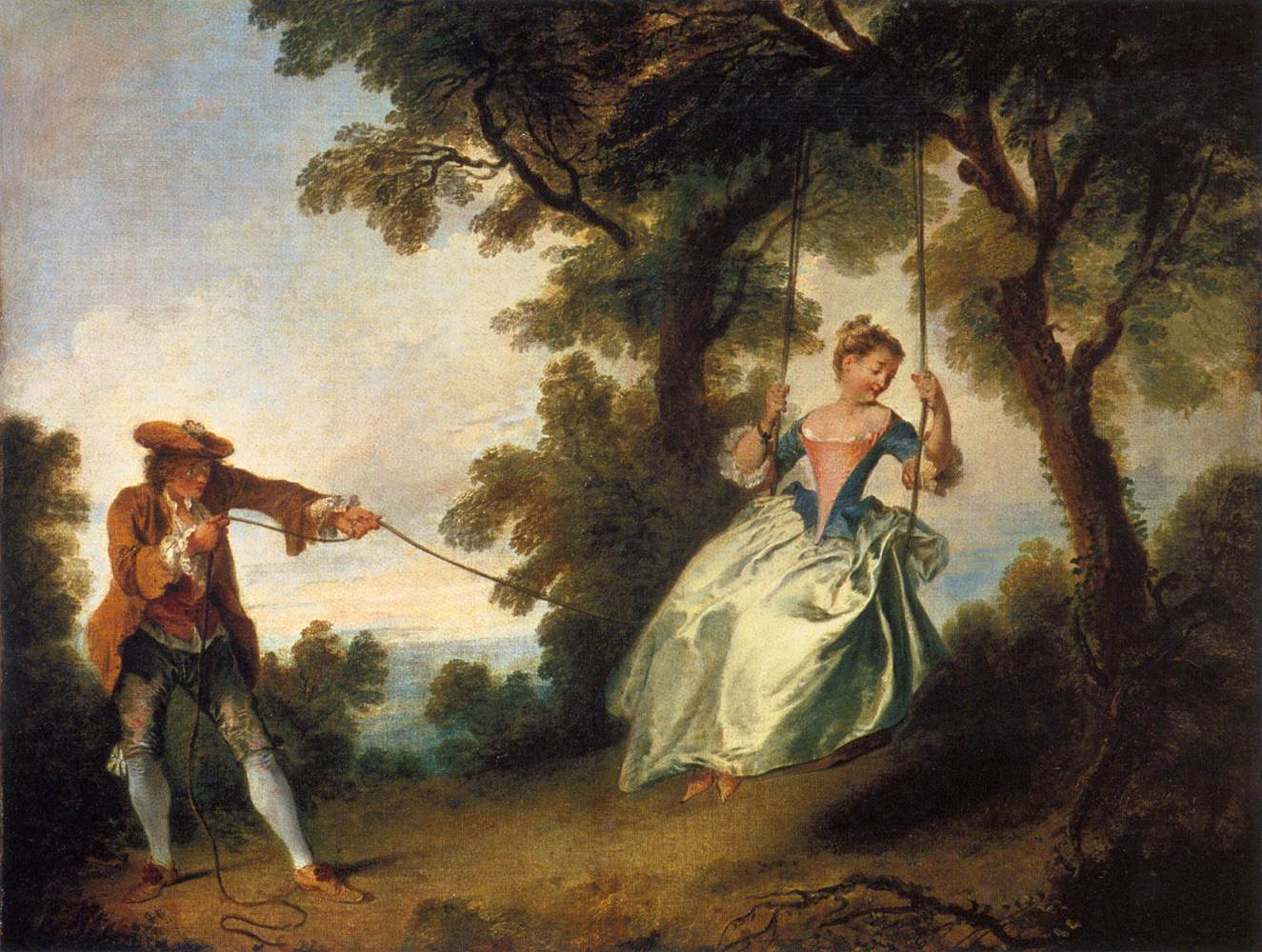
The Swing by Nicolas Lancret, 1735

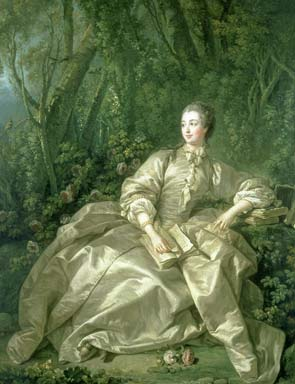
Portrait of Madame Pompadour by François Boucher, 1758

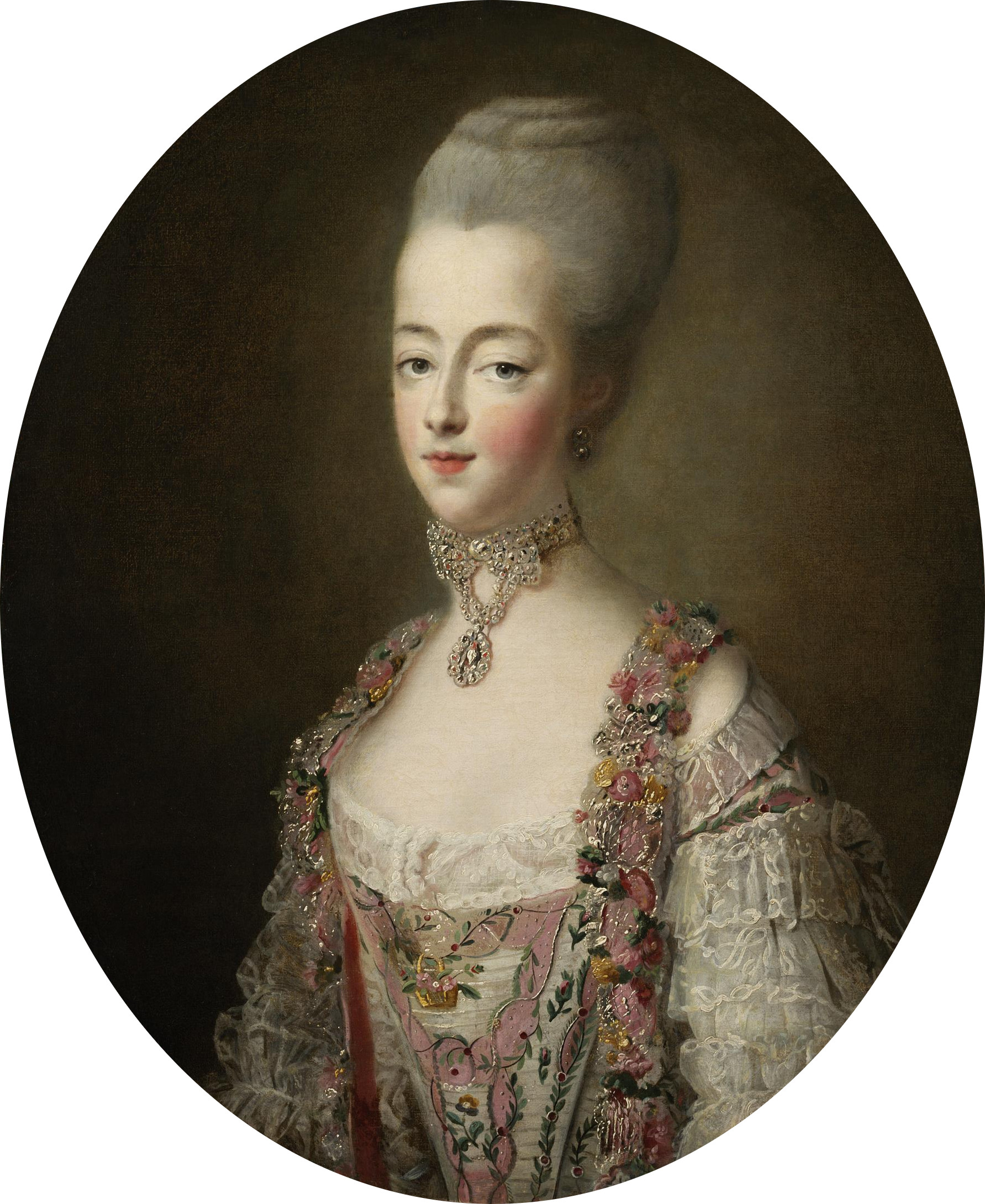
Portrait of Marie Antoinette by François-Hubert Drouais, 1773

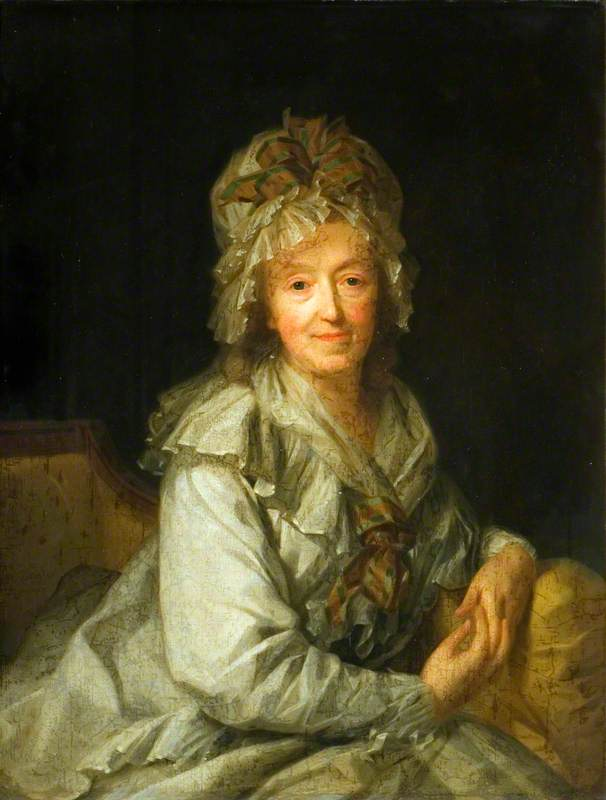
Portrait of a Lady in a White Cap by Johann Friedrich August Tischbein, 1793

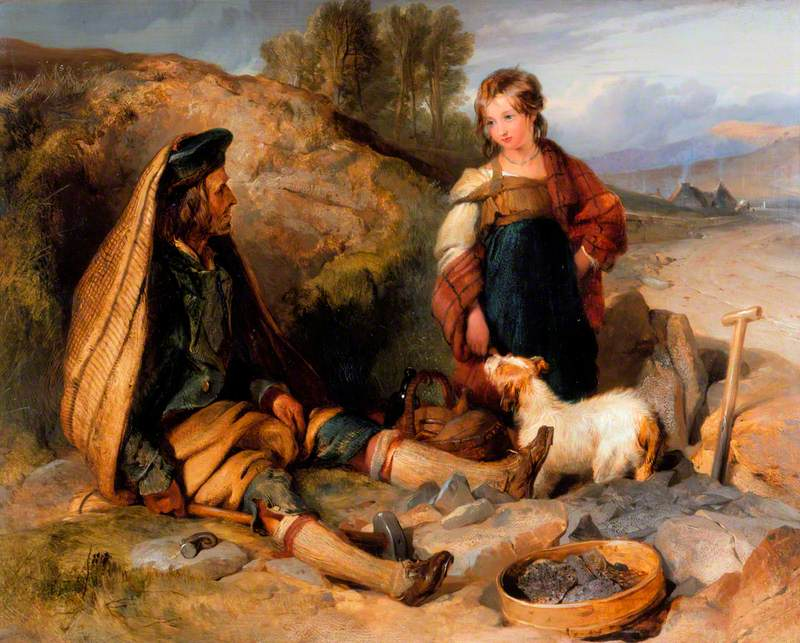
The Stone Breaker and His Daughter by Edwin Landseer, 1830

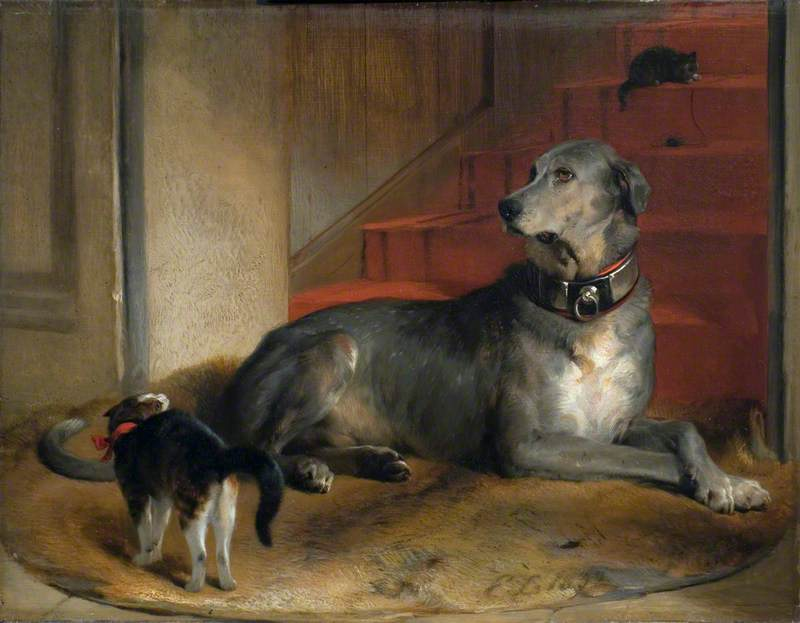
Lady Blessington's Dog by Edwin Landseer, 1832

Measuring Heights by William Powell Frith, 1842

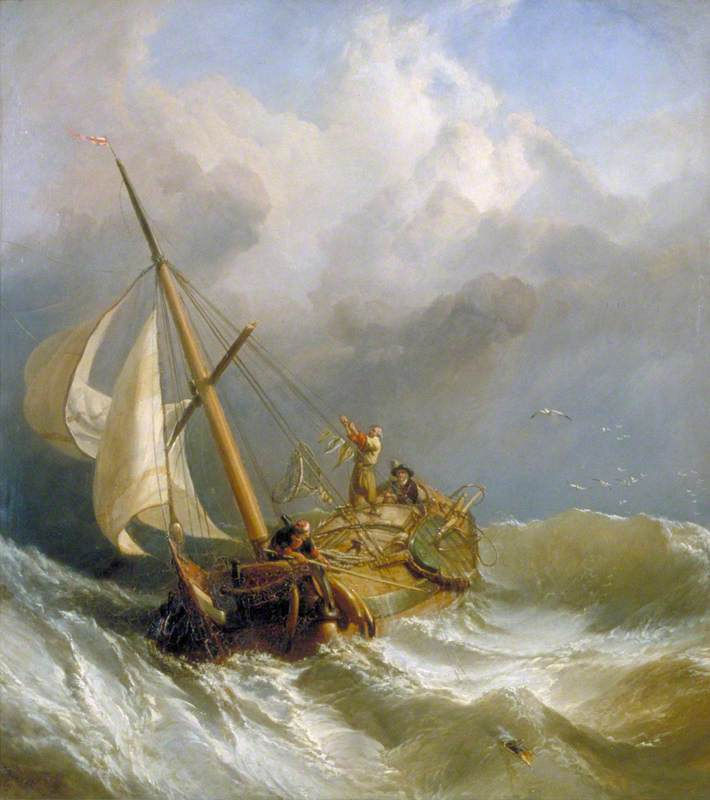
On the Dogger Bank by Clarkson Stanfield, 1846

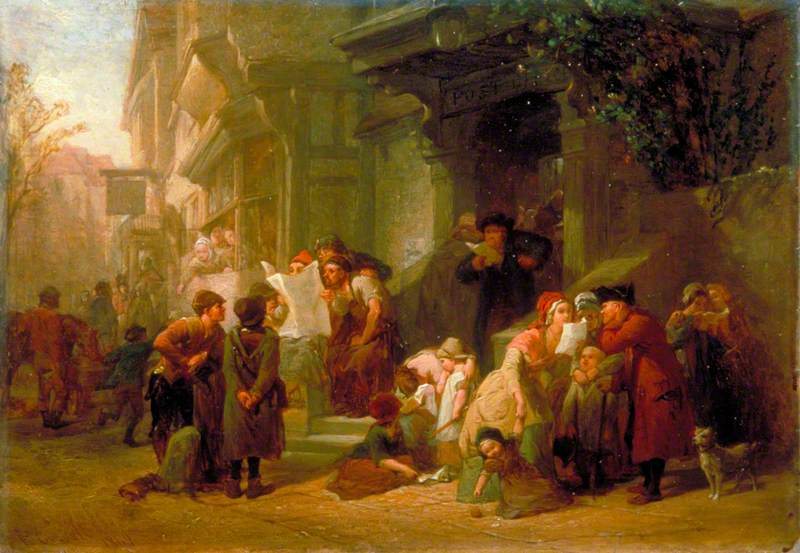
The Village Post Office by Frederick Goodall, 1849

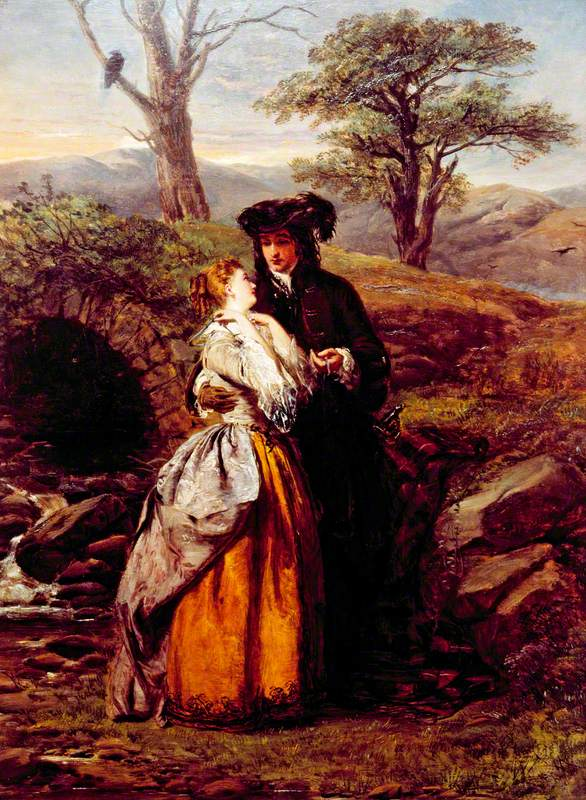
The Bride of Lammermoor by William Powell Frith, 1852

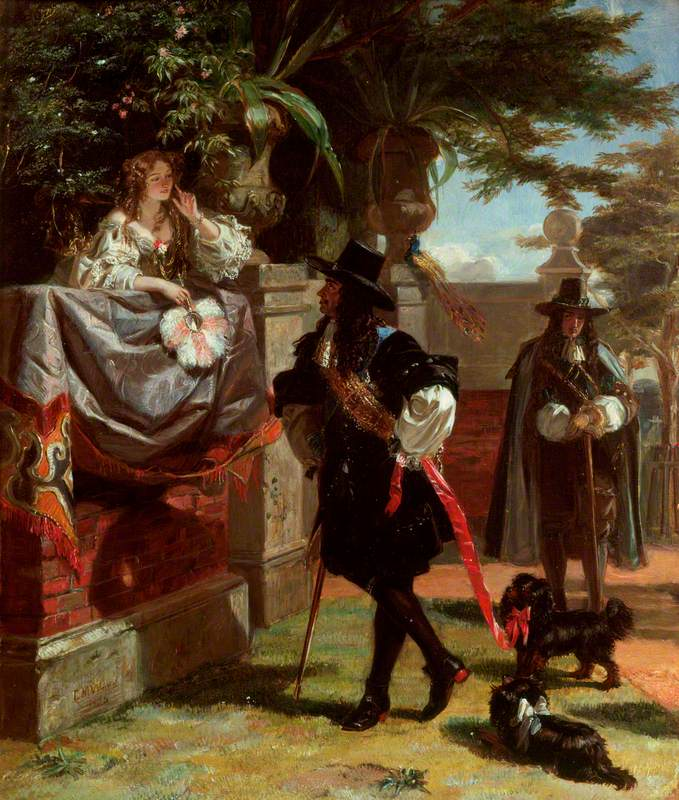
Charles II and Nell Gwyn by Edward Matthew Ward, 1854

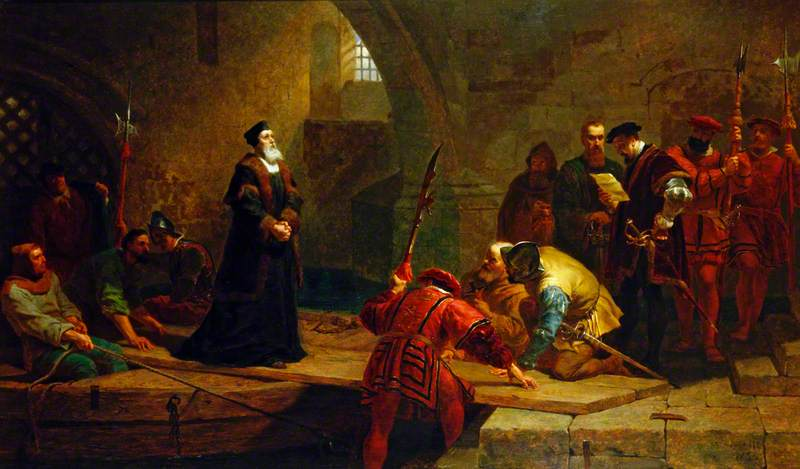
Cranmer at Traitor's Gate by Frederick Goodall, 1856

== See also ==
- Sheepshanks Gift, an 1857 donation to the Victoria and Albert Museum

== Bibliography ==
- Jackson, Anna M.F.A. V & A: A Hundred Highlights. Victoria and Albert Museum, 2001.
