= Clytie Transformed into a Sunflower =

Painting by Jean-François de Troy

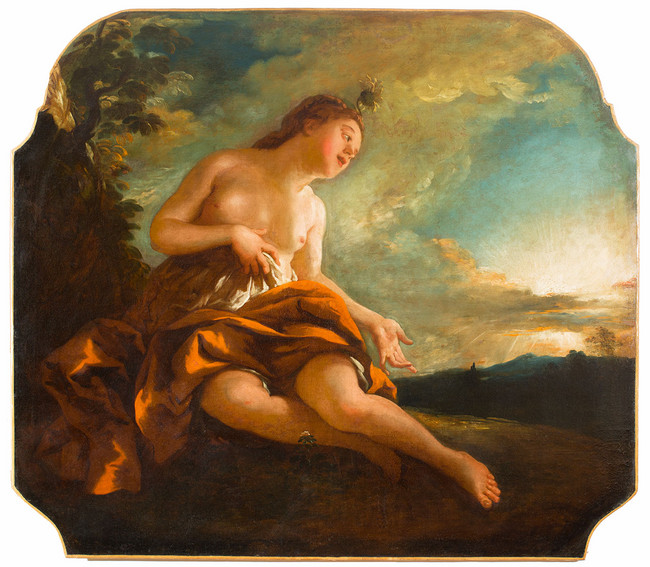
- Artist: Jean-François de Troy
- Year: c. 1730
- Medium: oil on canvas
- Dimensions: 126 cm × 142.2 cm (50 in × 56.0 in)
- Location: Musée du Grand Siècle, Saint-Cloud

Clytie Transformed into a Sunflower is an oil on canvas painting by the French artist Jean-François de Troy, from c. 1730. It is held at the Musée du Grand Siècle, in Saint-Cloud.

== History and description ==
Originally designed as an overdoor panel with a curved top, this horizontal painting is a mythological work illustrating a passage from Book IV of Ovid’s Metamorphoses, where the nymph Clytie is transformed into a flower, specifically a heliotrope.

The composition portrays the young Oceanid seated with her bare breasts, in a landscape bathed in veiled sunlight. She turns and leans lovingly toward the sun. A sunflower begins to grow from the top of her head, also oriented toward the luminous celestial body, extending the nymph’s gesture toward Helios, the sun god.

The painting belongs to the tradition of mythological allegory and explores themes of unrequited love, transformation, and celestial devotion. Clytie’s metamorphosis into a sunflower symbolizes her eternal gaze toward Helios, embodying both longing and constancy.

== Provenance ==
It was part of the inaugural donation made by Pierre Rosenberg to the Musée du Grand Siècle, in Saint-Cloud, where its held.
