= The Bride of Lammermoor (painting) =

Painting by William Powell Frith

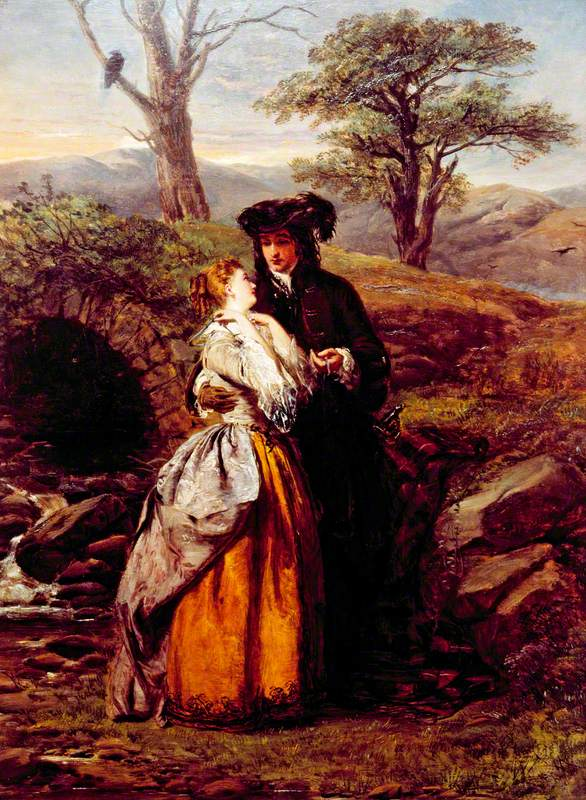
- Artist: William Powell Frith
- Year: 1852
- Type: Oil on panel, genre painting
- Dimensions: 36.8 cm × 28 cm (14.5 in × 11 in)
- Location: Victoria and Albert Museum, London

The Bride of Lammermoor is an oil on panel painting by the British artist William Powell Frith, from 1852. It is inspired by the 1819 novel of the same title by the Scottish author Sir Walter Scott. Part of Scott's series of Waverley Novels, it takes place around the time of the 1707 Act of Union. Frith began his career producing depictions of popular literary scenes before later becoming famous for his large-scale genre paintings such as The Derby Day and The Railway Station.

The painting was displayed at the Royal Academy Exhibition of 1852 at the National Gallery, in London. In 1882 it was given to the Victoria and Albert Museum in South Kensington as part of the Jones Bequest by John Jones.

== See also ==
- The Bride of Lammermoor, an 1878 painting by John Everett Millais

== Bibliography ==
- Bills, Mark & Knight, Vivien (ed.) William Powell Frith: Painting the Victorian Age. Yale University Press, 2006
- Gordon, Catherine May. British Paintings of Subjects from the English Novel, 1740-1870. Garland, 1988.
- Green, Richard & Sellars, Jane. William Powell Frith: The People's Painter. Bloomsbury, 2019.
- Roe, Sonia. Oil Paintings in Public Ownership in the Victoria and Albert Museum. Public Catalogue Foundation, 2008.
- Wood, Christopher. William Powell Frith: A Painter and His World. Sutton Publishing, 2006.
