= The Alarm (de Troy) =

Painting by Jean-François de Troy

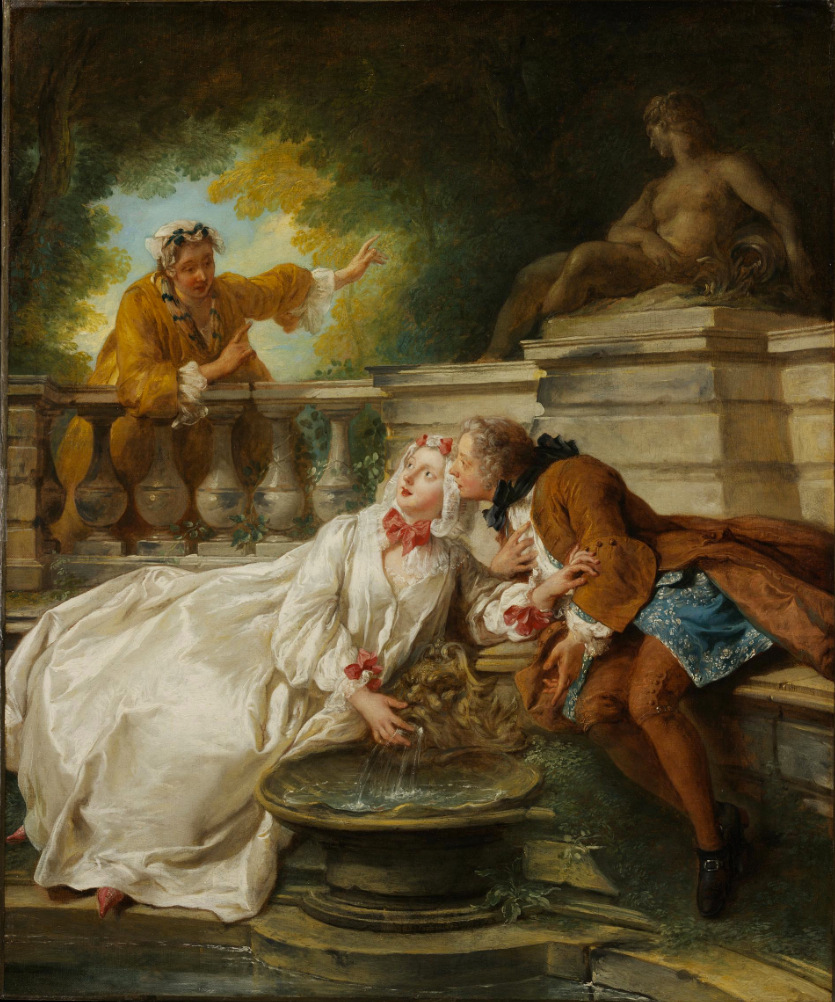
- Artist: Jean-François de Troy
- Year: 1723
- Medium: oil on canvas
- Dimensions: 69.5 cm × 63.8 cm (27.4 in × 25.1 in)
- Location: Victoria and Albert Museum, London

The Alarm, or The Faithful Housekeeper, is an oil on canvas painting by French painter Jean-François de Troy, from 1723. It is held in the Victoria and Albert Museum, in London.

== History and description ==
De Troy is considered the creator of the "tableaux de mode", of which this painting is an example. The painting was originally attributed to Antoine Watteau and is certainly inspired by his style. The work, like others of the author, is erotically charged. It depicts a secret meeting between two lovers, most likely of the nobility, because of their fine clothing, in a balustrade of a garden. The encounter and a possible kiss between the woman, at the left, and the man, is interrupted by a maid, who warns them of an upcoming danger. The woman is dressed in white and has one of her hands in a fountain with a grotesque face, that stands at the middle of the painting, perhaps as an erotic reference, while the androgynous looking man is elegantly dressed in brown. A nude classical statue of a nymph stands above the couple.

== Provenance ==
The painting was presented to the Victoria and Albert Museum by John Jones as part of the Jones Bequest in 1882.
