= Measuring Heights =

Painting by William Powell Frith

- Artist: William Powell Frith
- Year: 1842
- Type: Oil on panel, genre painting
- Dimensions: 22.8 cm × 30.5 cm (9.0 in × 12.0 in)
- Location: Victoria and Albert Museum, London

Measuring Heights is an oil on panel genre painting by the British artist William Powell Frith, from 1842.

== History and description ==
It depicts a scene from the 1766 novel The Vicar of Wakefield by Oliver Goldsmith. Mrs Primrose compares the respective heights of her daughter Olivia and Squire Thornhill. Depictions of popular scenes from literature enjoyed great success during the early Victorian era. A few years later William Mulready had a major hit with Choosing the Wedding Gown, inspired by the same novel.

The picture was displayed at the Royal Academy Exhibition of 1842 held at the National Gallery. The painting is now in the Victoria and Albert Museum in London, having been acquired in 1882 as part of the Jones Bequest by the art collector John Jones.

== Bibliography ==
- Bills, Mark & Knight, Vivien (ed.) William Powell Frith: Painting the Victorian Age. Yale University Press, 2006
- Gordon, Catherine May. British Paintings of Subjects from the English Novel, 1740-1870. Garland, 1988.
- Green, Richard & Sellars, Jane. William Powell Frith: The People's Painter. Bloomsbury, 2019.
- Wood, Christopher. William Powell Frith: A Painter and His World. Sutton Publishing, 2006.
