= The Village Post Office =

Painting by Frederick Goodall

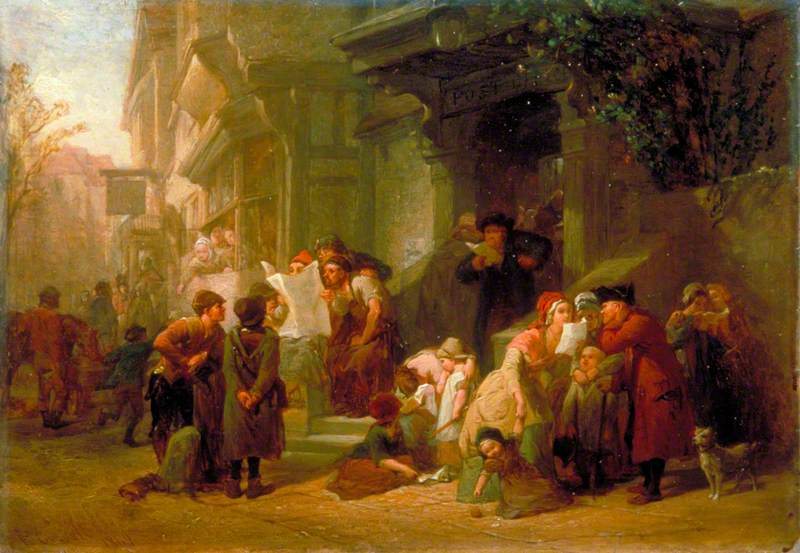
- Version in the Victoria and Albert Museum
- Artist: Frederick Goodall
- Year: 1849
- Type: Oil on panel, genre painting
- Dimensions: 20.3 cm × 29.2 cm (8.0 in × 11.5 in)
- Location: Victoria and Albert Museum, London

The Village Post Office is an 1849 oil painting by the British artist Frederick Goodall. A genre painting, it depicts a scene outside a post office in an English village, including a man reading aloud from a newspaper. It was one of his earliest prominent works in a long career stretching through the Victorian era. It makes reference to the penny post that had been established at the beginning of the decade. Equally it has been suggested that the scene at in fact be a nostalgic depiction of the eighteenth century.

The following year Goodall produced a larger, different version of the painting that he exhibited at the British Institution in 1850. It makes it more explicit that the man is reading news of the Sikh War from The Times. This was later engraved as a print by Charles William Sharpe. The smaller 1849 work is now in the Victoria and Albert Museum in London, having been given as part of the Jones Bequest by the art collector John Jones.

== Bibliography ==
- Parkinson, Ronald. Catalogue of British Oil Paintings 1820–1860. Victoria and Albert Museum, 1990.
- Reynolds, Graham. Victorian Painting. Harper & Row, 1987.
- Roe, Sonia. Oil Paintings in Public Ownership in the Victoria and Albert Museum. Public Catalogue Foundation, 2008.
