= Lady Blessington's Dog =

Painting by Edwin Landseer

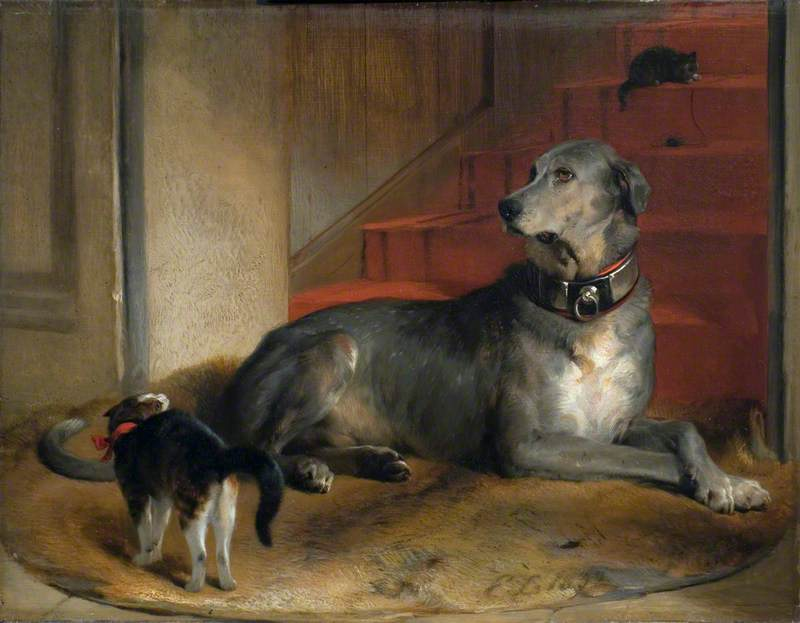
- Artist: Edwin Landseer
- Year: 1832
- Type: Oil on panel, genre painting
- Dimensions: 29.2 cm × 38.1 cm (11.5 in × 15.0 in)
- Location: Victoria and Albert Museum, London

Lady Blessington's Dog is an 1832 oil painting by the British artist Edwin Landseer. It is also known by the subtitle The Barrier. It features a dog laying across the bottom of a staircase, blocking a cat. The dog belonged to the Irish aristocrat and celebrated society figure and writer Marguerite Gardiner, Countess of Blessington. It was produced while she was living at Seamore Place in Mayfair. Landseer was part of the group of artists and writers who attended her salon there and later at Gore House in Kensington.

The painting was commissioned by Blessington herself. It was displayed at the 1833 exhibition of the British Institution held in Pall Mall. It hung at Gore House until the major sale held at Blessington 's death in 1849. It was subsequently acquired by the art collector John Jones who bequeathed it in 1882 to the Victoria and Albert Museum. The museum already possessed a number of other works by Landseer donated as part of the Sheepshanks Gift.

== Bibliography ==
- Graves, Algernon. The British Institution, 1806–1867: A Complete Dictionary of Contributors and Their Work. 1875.
- Ormond, Richard. Sir Edwin Landseer. Philadelphia Museum of Art, 1981.
- Parkinson, Ronald. Catalogue of British Oil Paintings 1820-1860. Victoria and Albert Museum, 1990.
