= The Stone Breaker and His Daughter =

Painting by Edwin Landseer

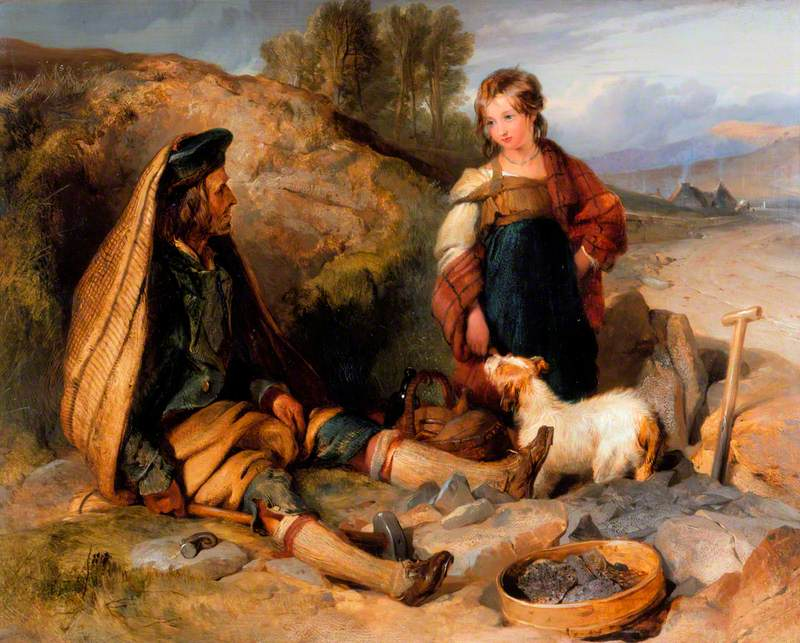
- Artist: Edwin Landseer
- Year: 1830
- Type: Oil on panel, genre painting
- Dimensions: 45.7 cm × 58.4 cm (18.0 in × 23.0 in)
- Location: Victoria and Albert Museum; London

The Stone Breaker and His Daughter is an 1830 genre painting by the British artist Edwin Landseer. It shows a stonebreaker, one of the workers who broke rocks for the laying of new roads, in the Scottish Highlands. Landseer offers a sympathetic depiction of the weary man, exhausted by his tiring labour, and contrasts it with the fresh-faced innocence of his young daughter who has brought him his lunch basket. It is also known simply as The Stonebreaker. The work was displayed at the British Institution's annual exhibition of 1830 in Pall Mall. Today the painting is in the collection of the Victoria and Albert Museum in South Kensington, having been part of the Jones Bequest by the art collector John Jones.

== Bibliography ==
- Jenkins, Adrian. Painters and Peasants: Henry La Thangue and British Rural Naturalism, 1880-1905. Bolton Museum and Art Gallery, 2000.
- Ormond, Richard. Sir Edwin Landseer. Philadelphia Museum of Art, 1981.

== See also ==
- The Stone Breakers, an 1849 painting by Gustave Courbet
