= Charles II and Nell Gwyn =

Painting by Edward Matthew Ward

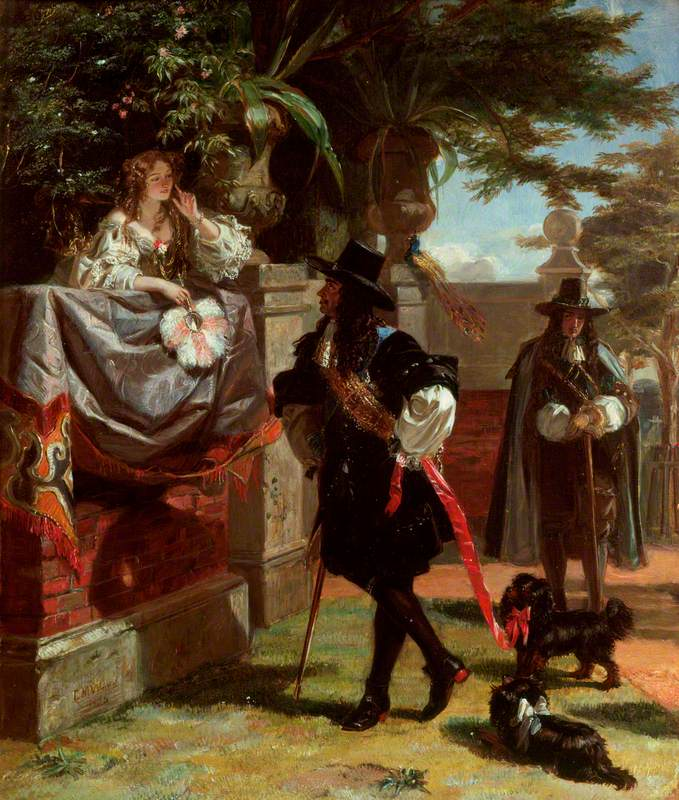
- Artist: Edward Matthew Ward
- Year: 1854
- Type: Oil on canvas, history painting
- Dimensions: 34.8 cm × 29.8 cm (13.7 in × 11.7 in)
- Location: Victoria and Albert Museum, London

Charles II and Nell Gwyn is an oil on canvas history painting by the British artist Edward Matthew Ward, from 1854.

== History and description ==
It depicts a scene featuring Charles II with his mistress, the celebrated actress Nell Gwyn. The picture is inspired by a passage in John Evelyn's Diary recording how Charles would stop on his walks around St James's Park to openly flirt with Gwyn. It captures the fashions of the Restoration era. Ward, a member of The Clique, had enjoyed major success with other history scenes that appealed to early Victorian tastes, particularly his 1847 work The South Sea Bubble.

The painting is now in the collection of the Victoria and Albert Museum in South Kensington, having been part of the large Jones Bequest of 1882.

== Bibliography ==
- Kern, Stephen. Eyes of Love: The Gaze in English and French Paintings and Novels, 1840-1900. Reaktion Books, 1996.
- Owens, Susan. Imagining England's Past: Inspiration, Enchantment, Obsession. Thames and Hudson, 2023.
- Parkinson, Ronald. Catalogue of British Oil Paintings 1820-1860. Victoria and Albert Museum, 1990.
