= The Bride of Lammermoor =

1819 novel by Walter Scott

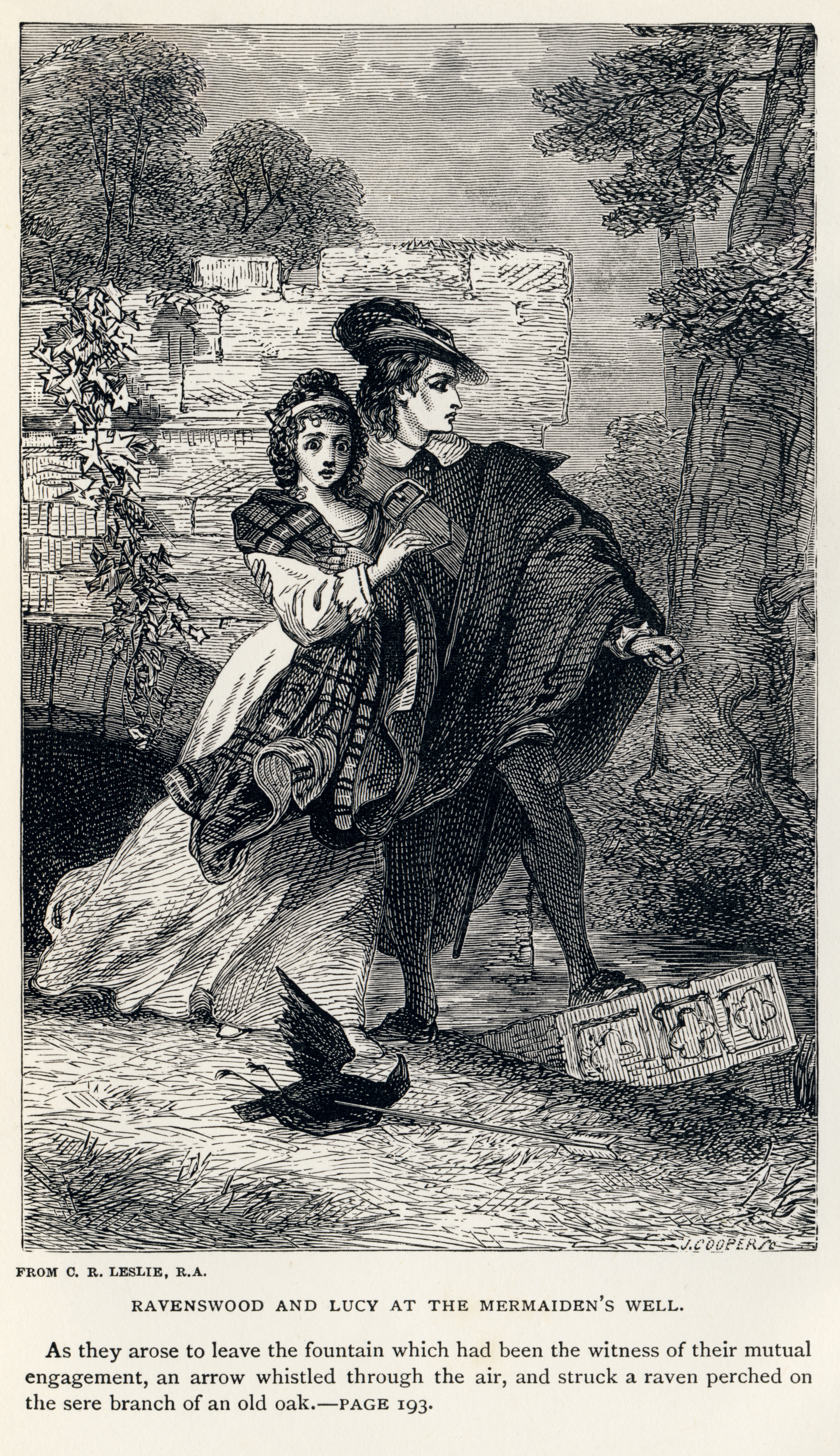
- Ravenswood and Lucy at the Mermaiden's Well by Charles Robert Leslie
- Author: Walter Scott
- Language: English, Lowland Scots
- Series: Waverley Novels
- Genre: Historical novel
- Published: 21 June 1819
- Publisher: Archibald Constable (Edinburgh); Longman, Hurst, Rees, Orme, and Brown, and Hurst, Robinson, and Co. (London)
- Publication place: Scotland
- Media type: Print
- Pages: 269 (Edinburgh Edition, 1993)
- Preceded by: The Heart of Mid-Lothian
- Followed by: A Legend of the Wars of Montrose

The Bride of Lammermoor is a historical novel by Sir Walter Scott, published in 1819, one of the Waverley novels. The novel is set in the Lammermuir Hills of south-east Scotland, shortly before the Act of Union of 1707 (in the first edition), or shortly after the Act (in the 'Magnum' edition of 1830). It tells of a tragic love affair between young Lucy Ashton and her family's enemy Edgar Ravenswood. Scott indicated the plot was based on an actual incident. The Bride of Lammermoor and A Legend of Montrose were published together anonymously as the third of Scott's Tales of My Landlord series. The story is the basis for Donizetti's 1835 opera Lucia di Lammermoor.

== Composition and sources ==
It is not known exactly when Scott contracted to write Tales of my Landlord (Third Series), but he began composition at the beginning of September 1818, some two months after completing The Heart of Midlothian and finished it in late April or early May the following year. During March he had to suspend work after a near-fatal attack of gallstones, but about a week into April he set about dictating the final chapters (from a little into Chapter 26 to the end), apparently to John Ballantyne and William Laidlaw.

Scott was acquainted with the central story of the novel from oral and printed sources, drawing on the various versions and modifying them for his fictional purposes (see 'The Ashton story' below). The presence of the Gowrie Conspiracy, familiar to him from his editorial labours in the 17th century, can be felt at a number of points in the work. For the hunting descriptions he was able to call on a work in his library, the second edition of George Turbervile's anonymous The Noble Art of Venerie or Hunting (1611).

== Editions ==
The first edition of Tales of my Landlord (Third Series), consisting of The Bride of Lammermoor and A Legend of Montrose was published by Archibald Constable in Edinburgh on 21 June 1819 and in London by Longman, Hurst, Rees, Orme, and Brown on the 26th. As with all the Waverley novels before 1827 publication was anonymous. The print run was probably 10,000 and the price was £1 12s (£1.60). Scott appears to have made some small changes to the text of the Bride when it appeared later in 1819 in the octavo Novels and Tales, but his main revision was carried out in late 1829 and early 1830 for the 'Magnum' edition, including the provision of notes and an introduction: it appeared as part of Volume 13 and the whole of Volume 14 in June and July 1830. For the 'Magnum' Scott moved the action from just before the Act of Union of 1707 to the period immediately following it.

The standard modern edition, by J. H. Alexander, was published as Volume 7a of the Edinburgh Edition of the Waverley Novels in 1993: this is based on the first edition with emendations principally from Scott's manuscript; the new Magnum material is included in Volume 25a.

== Plot summary ==
The story recounts the tragic love of Lucy Ashton and Edgar, Master of Ravenswood. Edgar's father was stripped of his title for supporting the deposed King James VII. Lucy's ambitious father, Sir William Ashton, then bought the Ravenswood estate. Edgar hates Sir William for this usurpation of his family's heritage, but on meeting Lucy, falls in love with her, and renounces his plans for vengeance.

Sir William's haughty and manipulative wife, Lady Ashton, is the villainess of the story. She is determined to end the initial happy engagement of Edgar and Lucy, and force Lucy into a politically advantageous arranged marriage. Lady Ashton intercepts Edgar's letters to Lucy and persuades Lucy that Edgar has forgotten her. Edgar leaves Scotland for France, to continue his political activities. While he is away, Lady Ashton continues her campaign. She gets Captain Westenho, a wandering soldier of fortune, to tell everyone that Edgar is about to get married in France. She even recruits "wise woman" Ailsie Gourlay (a witch in all but name) to show Lucy omens and tokens of Edgar's unfaithfulness. Lucy still clings to her troth, asking for word from Edgar that he has broken off with her; she writes to him. Lady Ashton suppresses Lucy's letter, and brings the Reverend Bide-the-bent to apply religious persuasion to Lucy. However, Bide-the-bent instead helps Lucy send a new letter, but there is no answer.

Lady Ashton finally bullies Lucy into marrying Francis, Laird of Bucklaw. But on the day before the wedding, Edgar returns. Seeing that Lucy has signed the betrothal papers with Bucklaw, he repudiates Lucy, who can barely speak. The wedding takes place the next day, followed by a celebration at Ravenswood. While the guests are dancing, Lucy stabs Bucklaw in the bridal chamber, severely wounding him. She descends quickly into insanity and dies. Bucklaw recovers, but refuses to say what had happened. Edgar reappears at Lucy's funeral. Lucy's older brother, blaming him for her death, insists that they meet in a duel. Edgar, in despair, reluctantly agrees. But on the way to the meeting, Edgar falls into quicksand and dies.

== Characters ==
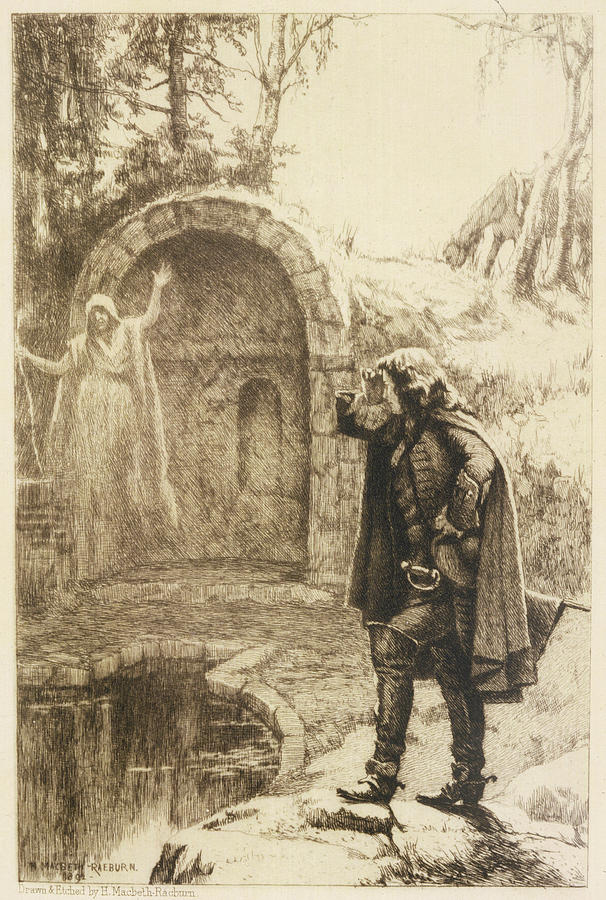
Ravenswood encounters the apparition of Alice, illustrated by Henry Macbeth-Raeburn (1892)

principal characters in bold

- **Edgar**, Master of Ravenswood
- **Caleb Balderstone**, his steward
- Mysie, Caleb's wife
- **Sir William Ashton**, Lord Keeper
- **Lady Ashton**, his wife
- **Lucy**, their daughter
- **Colonel Sholto Douglas Ashton** and **Henry Ashton**, their sons
- Norman, Ashton's forester
- Mr Lockhard, Ashton's servant
- **Ailsie Gourlay**, a 'wise woman'
- Annie Winnie, one of her two companions
- **Captain Craigengelt**
- **Frank Hayston**, laird of Bucklaw
- Lady Girnington, his aunt
- Lady Blenkinsop, his kinswoman
- **Alice**, a blind servant of the Ravenswood family
- Mr Bide-the-Bent, a minister
- John Girder, a cooper ('Gibbie' Girder in some editions)
- Mrs Girder, his wife
- The Marquis of A——
- Davie Dingwall, an attorney
- John Mortsheugh, a sexton

== Chapter summary ==
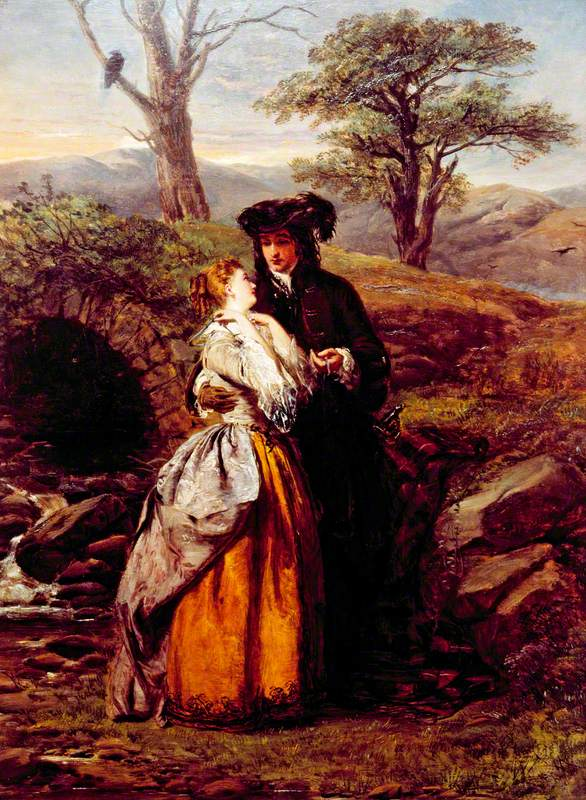
The Bride of Lammermoor by William Powell Frith, 1852

Volume One

Ch. 1: Peter Pattieson tells how he compiled the following tale from fragmentary notes taken by his late friend, the artist Dick Tinto, from one of the stories told by a Lammermoor farmer's wife.

Ch. 2: The narrator introduces the Ravenswood and Ashton families. Edgar Ravenswood buries his father in an episcopalian ceremony, defying the authority of the local kirk session and Sir William Ashton as Lord Keeper.

Ch. 3: The recollection of a medieval act of revenge by a Ravenswood leads Ashton to suspend his intended legal proceedings against Edgar. He takes his daughter Lucy for a walk in the park, encountering his forester Norman who despises him for lacking a taste for sport.

Ch. 4: Ashton and his daughter visit old Alice, who warns him of the vengeful nature of the Ravenswoods.

Ch. 5: Edgar rescues Lucy from a wild bull and tends her at a fountain popularly believed to be unlucky for the Ravenswoods. He reveals his identity and leaves. Lucy's imagination nourishes thoughts of Edgar, and her father tones down his report on the funeral, to the surprise of his colleagues in Edinburgh.

Ch. 6: Bucklaw and Craigengelt discuss their support for Edgar in his dispute with Ashton, but on his arrival Edgar says he has decided to drop the matter, arousing the indignation of the pair.

Ch. 7: Challenged to a duel by Bucklaw, Edgar defeats him before offering him shelter at his dilapidated castle of Wolfscrag, to the displeasure of his servant Caleb.

Ch. 8: Edgar and Bucklaw pass several days of inactivity at Wolfscrag. A letter arrives from the Marquis of A—— advising him against travelling abroad but offering him no hospitality.

Ch. 9: Surprised by a storm while out hunting the Ashtons take refuge at Wolfscrag.

Ch. 10: Conscious of the lack of provisions, Caleb excludes the Ashton grooms and Bucklaw, who indignantly joins Craigengelt at the Wolfshope inn. As Edgar greets Lucy at the castle there is a fearful burst of lightning and thunder.

Ch. 11: Caleb says the thunder has spoiled a lavish (fictitious) feast.

Ch. 12: Caleb steals a duck from the turnspit at the house of John Girder the cooper, part of the refreshments for a christening party.

Ch. 13: Girder is at first indignant at Caleb's raid, but he sends additional provisions to Wolfscrag when he sees the chance of winning promotion through the good offices of the Lord Keeper.

Ch. 14: Caleb and Ashton's servant Lockhard discuss the Ravenswoods and the Ashtons. Ashton suggests to Edgar that they should reconcile their differences.

Volume Two

Ch. 1 (15): The narrator explains the self-seeking political reasoning behind Ashton's wish for a reconciliation with Edgar.

Ch. 2 (16): Edgar declines to discuss his legal dispute with Ashton, who is planning to make use of the relationship between Edgar and his daughter for his own purposes. Craigengelt conveys a challenge from Bucklaw to Edgar and is sent packing.

Ch. 3 (17): Ashton convinces Edgar that he has treated him well in sparing him the consequences of his father's funeral, and Edgar professes his friendship.

Ch. 4 (18): Caleb tries to deter Edgar from visiting Ravenswood Castle, now occupied by the Ashtons, citing an old prophecy, but Edgar ignores him and on his arrival frightens young Henry Ashton with his resemblance to a portrait of his vengeful ancestor Sir Malise Ravenswood.

Ch. 5 (19): Edgar and Lucy visit Alice who warns against their alliance.

Ch. 6 (20): Edgar and Lucy become engaged at the fountain, dividing a gold coin between them. On their return to Ravenswood Castle they learn that the Marquis of A—— is planning a visit.

Ch. 7 (21): Edgar and Lucy find they disagree on several matters but their relationship continues to grow. Craigengelt gives Bucklaw his support in his intention to marry Lucy, the match being favoured by Lady Ashton and Bucklaw's kinswoman Lady Blenkinsop.

Ch. 8 (22): Craigengelt informs Lady Ashton, who is staying with Lady Blenkinsop, of Edgar's residence at Ravenswood Castle. She arrives at the Castle simultaneously with the Marquis. In spite of her husband's objection Lady Ashton writes a note requiring Edgar to leave the castle, incurring the Marquis's displeasure.

Ch. 9 (23): Edgar sees an apparition of Alice at the fountain. He arrives at her cottage to find her dead, and three old women arrive to lay her out.

Ch. 10 (24): Edgar arranges Alice's funeral with the sexton John Mortsheugh.

Ch. 11 (25): The Marquis expresses doubts about the wisdom of Edgar's relationship with Lucy and offers him a political commission involving a period on the Continent. Caleb announces that Wolfscrag, to which Edgar and the Marquis are bound, is on fire. He is made welcome at the house of John Girder, now promoted.

Ch. 12 (26): Caleb explains to Edgar that the fire was in reality not in Wolfscrag, but a device to avoid the necessity to entertain the Marquis and his entourage.

Ch. 13 (27): In Edinburgh Edgar writes to Lady Ashton, Ashton, and Lucy and receives replies, uncompromising, non-committal, and distressed respectively.

Volume Three

Ch. 1 (28): Twelve months have passed, and Bucklaw and Craigengelt discuss Bucklaw's impending marriage to Lucy.

Ch. 2 (29): Bucklaw and Lady Ashton agree with Lucy that the marriage documents will be signed if no word has been received from Edgar by St Jude's day.

Ch. 3 (30): (This and the following chapter fill in developments retrospectively.) Lady Ashton exercised strict control on Lucy's movements and correspondence.

Ch. 4 (31): The 'wise woman' Aislie Gourlay was brought in to act as Lucy's nurse and told her dark stories about the Ravenswoods. A strict minister was also summoned, but he agreed to forward a letter from Lucy to Edgar, reproducing one dictated by her mother but which Lady Ashton had decided not to send: this was phrased so as to appear to be a request for Edgar to renounce their engagement.

Ch. 5 (32): On St Jude's day Edgar arrives just as the marriage contract has been signed.

Ch. 6 (33): Edgar renounces the engagement in conformity with what he takes to be Lucy's wish, though she is almost entirely silent.

Ch. 7 (34): Lucy stabs Bucklaw on their wedding night and dies the following day. Bucklaw says that he will never disclose to any man or woman the reason for Lucy stabbing him.

Ch. 8 (35): At Lucy's funeral Colonel Ashton arranges a duel with Edgar at sunrise the following morning. On his way to the arranged meeting-place Edgar and his horse disappear in a quicksand.

== Reception ==
Among contemporary reviewers only the writer in The Scotsman found The Bride of Lammermoor uniformly excellent. There was a general tendency to lament Walter Scott's familiar stylistic carelessness and weak plotting, and some reviewers saw a distinct decline from the preceding novels, with signs of exhaustion and less-interesting subject-matter. Repetition of characters was mentioned more than once, though sometimes with a recognition that there were discriminations to be discerned, and in general the characterisation and the dialogue of the lower orders was appreciated. The tragic power of the final scenes was widely appreciated, but the admixture of ludicrous humour was a defect for some, as was the overall gloomy and painful atmosphere. The portrayal of Caleb was widely praised, but there were complaints that he was unvarying and that he perhaps outstayed his welcome. Views differed on the superstitious element, variously judged effectively employed, or foolish and unfortunately pervasive. The introductory chapter centring on Dick Tinto pleased reviewers more than the Cleishbotham openings of earlier novels.

== The Ashton story ==
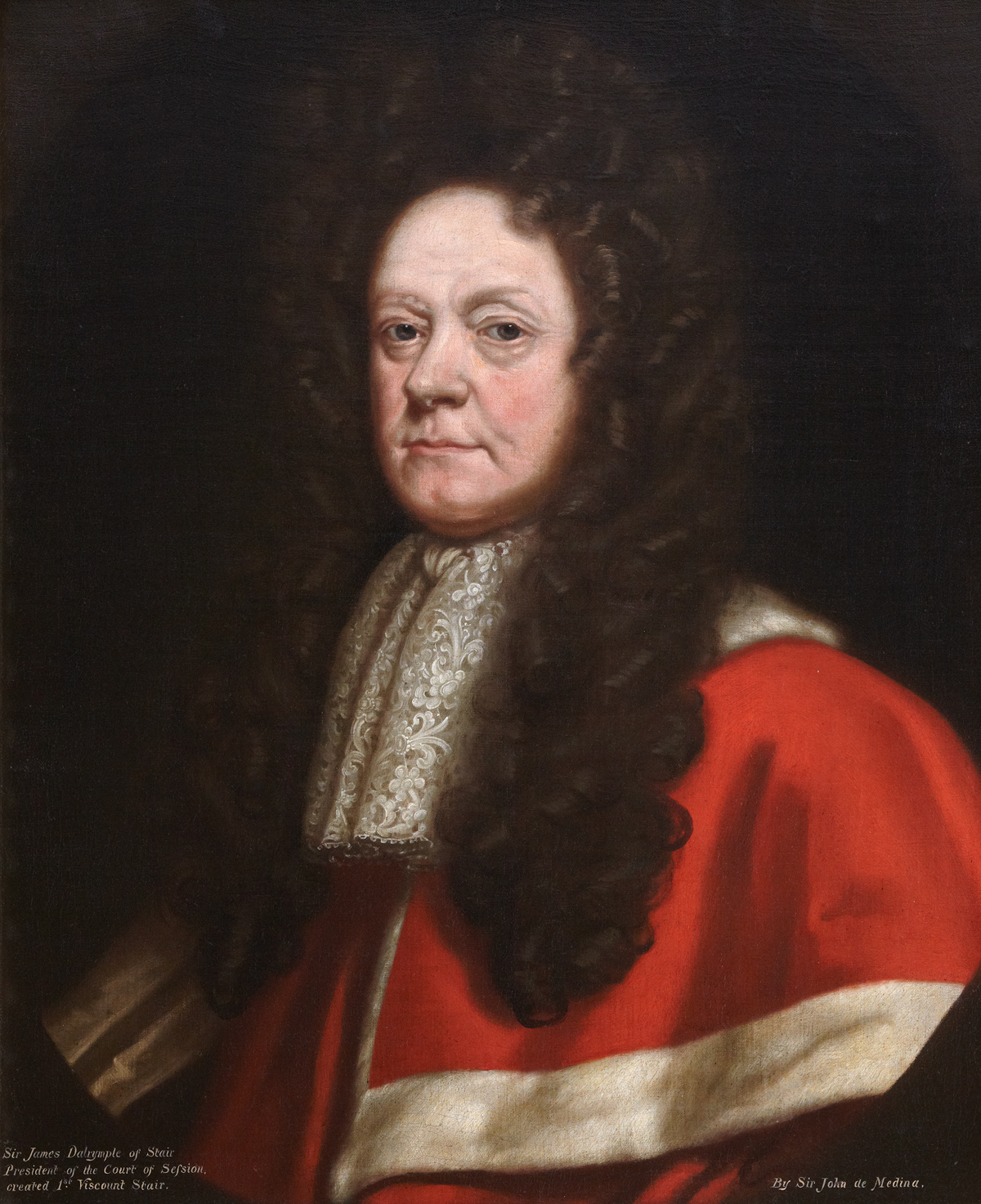
Viscount Stair (1619–1695) whose daughter provided the model for Lucy Ashton

The story is fictional, but according to Scott's introduction to the novel for the 'Magnum' edition it was based on an actual incident in the history of the Dalrymple and Rutherford families. Scott heard this story from his mother, Anne Rutherford, and his great-aunt Margaret Swinton. The model for Lucy Ashton was Janet Dalrymple, eldest daughter of James Dalrymple, 1st Viscount of Stair, and his wife Margaret Ross of Balneil. As a young woman, Janet secretly pledged her troth to Archibald, third Lord Rutherfurd, relative and heir of the Earl of Teviot, who was thus the model for Edgar of Ravenswood. When another suitor appeared - David Dunbar, heir of Sir David Dunbar of Baldoon Castle near Wigtown - Janet's mother, Margaret, discovered the betrothal but insisted on the match with Dunbar. Rutherfurd's politics were unacceptable to the Dalrymples: Lord Stair was a staunch Whig, whereas Rutherfurd was an ardent supporter of Charles II. Nor was his lack of fortune in his favour. Attempting to intercede he wrote to Janet, but received a reply from her mother, stating that Janet had seen her mistake. A meeting was then arranged, during which Margaret quoted the Book of Numbers (chapter XXX, verses 2–5), which states that a father may overrule a vow made by his daughter in her youth.

The marriage went ahead on 24 August 1669, in the church of Old Luce, Wigtownshire, two miles south of Carsecleugh Castle, one of her father's estates. Her younger brother later recollected that Janet's hand was "cold and damp as marble", and she remained impassive the whole day. While the guests danced the couple retired to the bedchamber. When screaming was heard from the room, the door was forced open and the guests found Dunbar stabbed and bleeding. Janet, whose shift was bloody, cowered in the corner, saying only "take up thy bonny bridgroom." Janet died, apparently insane, on 12 September, without divulging what had occurred. She was buried on 30 September. Dunbar recovered from his wounds, but similarly refused to explain the event. He remarried in 1674, to Lady Eleanor Montgomerie, daughter of the Earl of Eglinton, but died on 28 March 1682 after falling from a horse between Leith and Edinburgh. Rutherfurd died in 1685, without children.

It was generally believed that Janet had stabbed her new husband, though other versions of the story suggest that Rutherfurd hid in the bedchamber in order to attack his rival Dunbar, before escaping through the window. The involvement of the devil or other malign spirits has also been suggested. Scott quotes the Rev. Andrew Symson (1638–1712), former minister of Kirkinner, who wrote a contemporary elegy "On the unexpected death of the virtuous Lady Mrs. Janet Dalrymple, Lady Baldoon, younger", which also records the dates of the events. More scurrilous verses relating to the story are also quoted by Scott, including those by Lord Stair's political enemy Sir William Hamilton of Whitelaw.

It is said that Janet was buried at Newliston near Edinburgh, but Janet's brother John, later Earl of Stair, married Elizabeth Dundas of Newliston in 1669, and he may not have been at Newliston when Janet died. Janet may have been buried by her husband at Glenluce.

Scott's biographers have compared elements of The Bride of Lammermoor with Scott's own romantic involvement with Williamina Belsches in the 1790s. The bitterness apparent in the relationship between Lucy Ashton and Edgar of Ravenswood after their betrothal is broken has been compared to Scott's disappointment when, after courting her for some time, Belsches married instead the much wealthier William Forbes.

== Locations ==
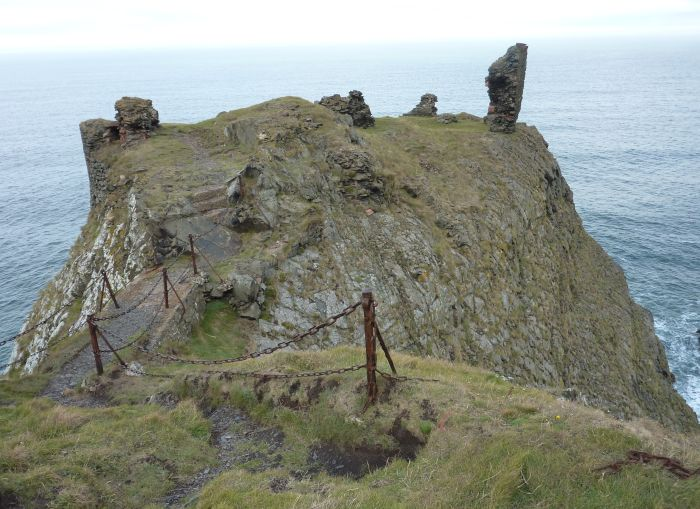
The precipitous Fast Castle, identified with the "Wolf's Crag"

The spelling Lammermoor is an Anglicisation of the Scots Lammermuir. The Lammermuir Hills are a range of moors which divide East Lothian to the north from Berwickshire in the Scottish Borders to the south. The fictional castle "Wolf's Crag" has been identified with Fast Castle on the Berwickshire coast. Scott stated that he was "not competent to judge of the resemblance... having never seen Fast Castle except from the sea." He did approve of the comparison, writing that the situation of Fast Castle "seems certainly to resemble that of Wolf's Crag as much as any other".

== The name "Edgar" ==
The Bride of Lammermoor by John Everett Millais, 1878

Like most Anglo-Saxon names, the name "Edgar" had fallen out of use by the later medieval period. The success of The Bride of Lammermoor had a considerable role in this name being revived and becoming widely used, up to the present.
