= The Bride of Lammermoor (Millais) =

Painting by John Everett Millais

- Artist: John Everett Millais
- Year: 1878
- Type: Oil on canvas, genre painting
- Dimensions: 151.1 cm × 107.3 cm (59.5 in × 42.2 in)
- Location: City Museum and Art Gallery, Bristol

The Bride of Lammermoor is an 1878 oil painting by the British artist John Everett Millais. It is inspired by the 1819 novel The Bride of Lammermoor by the Romantic author Walter Scott. It shows Edgar the Master of Ravenwood having just rescued Lucy Ashton from a wild bull. The dispute between their families explains the slightly tense manners between them.

Millais exhibited the work as part of his submission to the Exposition Universelle in Paris, a major art showcase rather than the Royal Academy Exhibition of 1878 where he usually submitted work. It was acquired by the Bristol City Museum and Art Gallery in a 1927 gift by Walter Melville Wills. An engraving based on the painting was created by Thomas Oldham Barlow in 1882.

Walter Scott's novels were a popular source for paintings in the Victorian era. William Powell Frith produced his own painting The Bride of Lammermoor in 1852 based on the same novel.

== Bibliography ==
- Barlow, Paul. Time Present and Time Past: The Art of John Everett Millais. Routledge, 2017.
- Rigney, Ann. The Afterlives of Walter Scott: Memory on the Move. Oxford University Press, 2012.
