= The Garter =

Painting by Jean-François de Troy

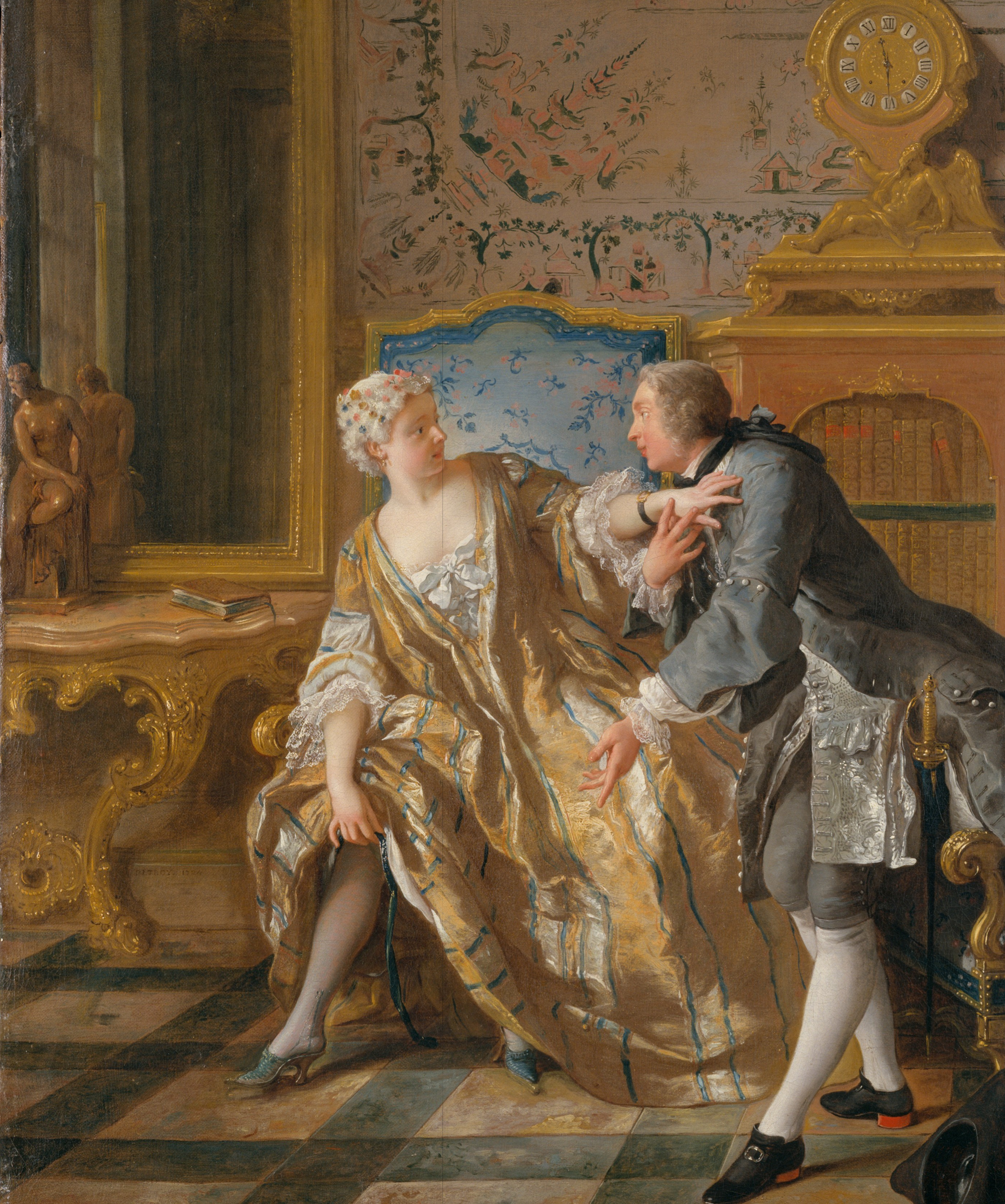
- Artist: Jean-François de Troy
- Year: 1724
- Medium: oil on canvas
- Dimensions: 64.8 cm × 53.7 cm (25.5 in × 21.1 in)
- Location: Metropolitan Museum of Art, New York

The Garter is an oil on canvas painting by French painter Jean-François de Troy, from 1724. It is held at the Metropolitan Museum of Art, in New York. A pendant painting to this one is The Declaration of Love, of the same year.

== Description ==
The painting, like others by de Troy, is erotically charged, and depicts a scene of intimacy in a finely decorated room, between a couple, possibly of lovers that, judging by their fine clothing, are from the nobility. The woman, at the left, is reattaching the garter on her leg. The man, at her right, offers to help, but she rejects firmly his assistance with a gesture of her hand. The man's tricorn lies at the ground. At her left, a book lies on a table, where also stands a nude classical female statuette. Behind the table a mirror reflects the statuette and shows a nearby window. At the left a fine clock, decorated with a seated statuette of Saturn at his bottom, in a style similar to the work of the furniture designer André-Charles Boulle, stands in a bookshelf.

Mary Salzman states about this painting: "In The Garter, the nude female statuette and the clock disclose that the young woman, though initially resistant, will allows herself to be seduced. She will eventually arrive at the same state of undress as the bronze - starting with her garter."
