= Jean-François de Troy =

French painter (1679–1752)

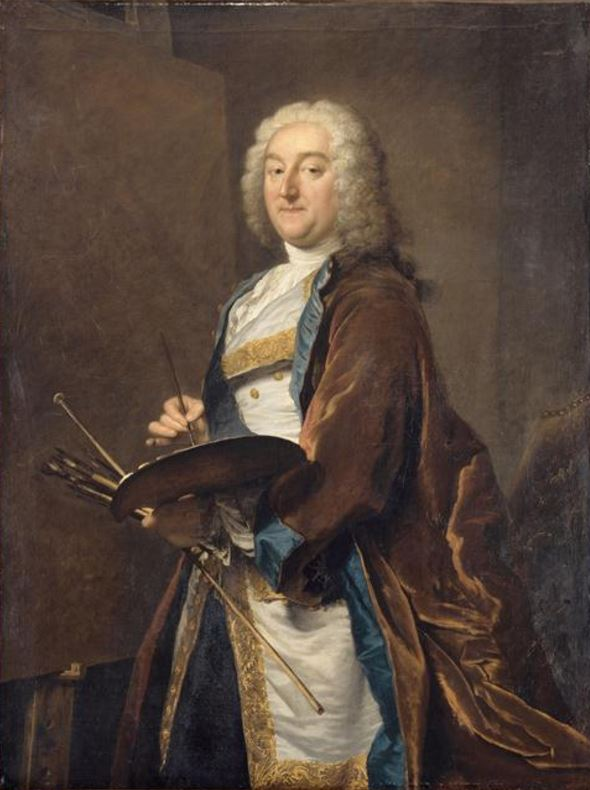
- Portrait of Jean-Francois de Troy by Joseph Aved, 1734
- Born: 27 January 1679; Paris, France
- Died: 26 January 1752 (aged 72); Rome, Italy
- Known for: Painting

Jean-François de Troy (27 January 1679, Paris – 26 January 1752, Rome) was a French Rococo easel and fresco painter, draughtsman and tapestry designer. One of France's leading history painters in his time, he was equally successful with his decorative paintings, genre scenes and portraits. He was the inventor of the tableaux de modes ('paintings of fashions'), which attempted to provide a spirited portrayal of contemporary fashions, pastimes and manners.

He was the Director of the French Academy in Rome from 1738.

== Life ==
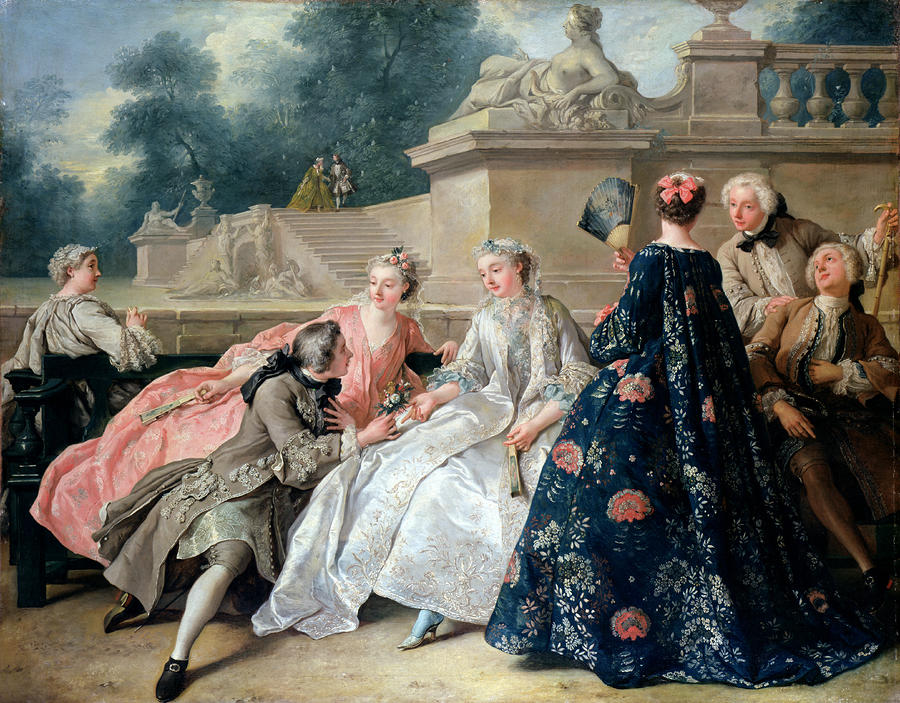
Declaration of Love (1731)

He was a scion of a family of painters. His father was the portrait painter François de Troy (1645–1730). His father was his first teacher. After he failed to win the Prix de Rome, he went at his father's expense to Italy from 1699 to 1706. He stayed initially in Rome, where he was given a room at the French Academy. He also visited northern Italian cities. He was at the same time aggregated and admitted to the Académie royale de peinture et de sculpture in July 1708, presumably on the strength of his composition Niobe and her Children (Musée Fabre) but certainly not without a little help of his father who was then the director of that institution.

He undertook commissions for the Palace of Versailles and the Palace of Fontainebleau between 1724 and 1737. In 1738 he left France for Rome following his appointment as Director of the French Academy in Rome. He resided the rest of his life in Rome. He was also elected as an honorary member of the Roman Academy of St Luke, and subsequently appointed briefly its director in 1744.

De Troy was twice ennobled in his lifetime, the first time when he bought the office of the secrétaire du roi ('secretary to the King') and a second time on the award of the ordre de Saint Michel. According to contemporary reports he lived a luxurious life style in Rome and entertained guests from the higher social circles in Rome.

De Troy met tragedy in his personal life: his wife died at a young age and his seven children all died before him. He died on 26 January 1752 in Rome.

== Work ==
=== General ===
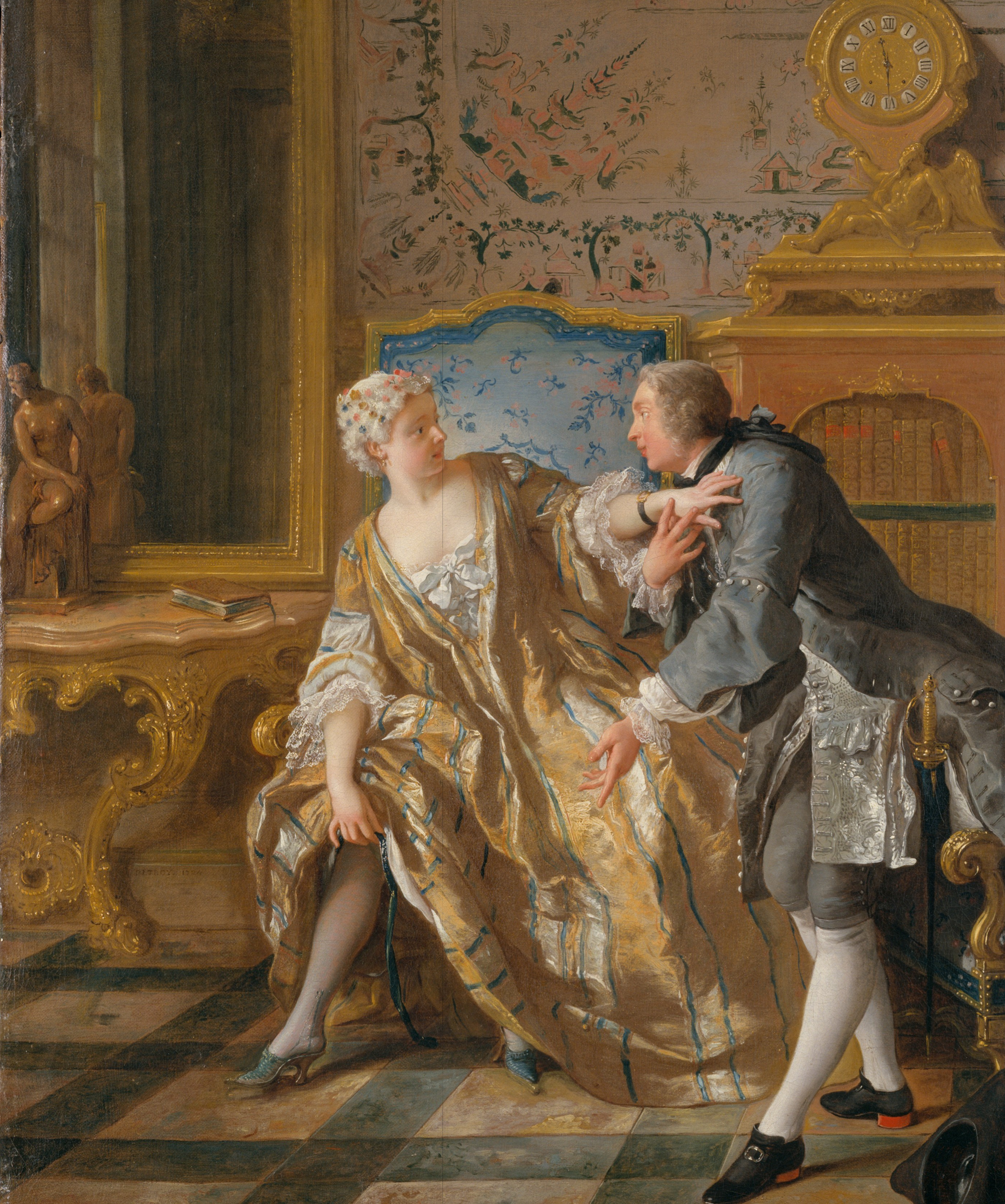
The Garter (1724)

Jean François de Troy forged a successful career with his large-formate historical and allegorical compositions. His history paintings and mythological scenes were executed in a colourful and fluent style, which was indebted to both Veronese and Peter Paul Rubens. An example is his allegorical Time Unveiling Truth (1733, National Gallery, London).

During his residence in Rome, de Troy was also active as a fresco painter. He made a fresco in the north aisle of the ancient basilica Santi Bonifacio ed Alessio depicting Saint Gerolamo Emiliani introducing orphans to the Virgin.

=== Tableaux de mode ===
His modern reputation relies less on his large history and mythological paintings than on his smaller, (cabinet-sized) scenes of elegant social life, which he painted in Paris between 1725 and 1738. These pictures depict fashionable people from his time in parks or interior settings who are engaged in courting, card playing, or reading to each other. While based on the fêtes galantes of Watteau and Nicolas Lancret and on 17th-century Dutch genre painting, de Troy's compositions distinguish themselves through their detailed rendering of clothing and furnishings. The dress of the protagonists discloses their high social status. These tableaux de mode are also characterized by the meticulous handling of the paint and their luxurious and modish qualities.

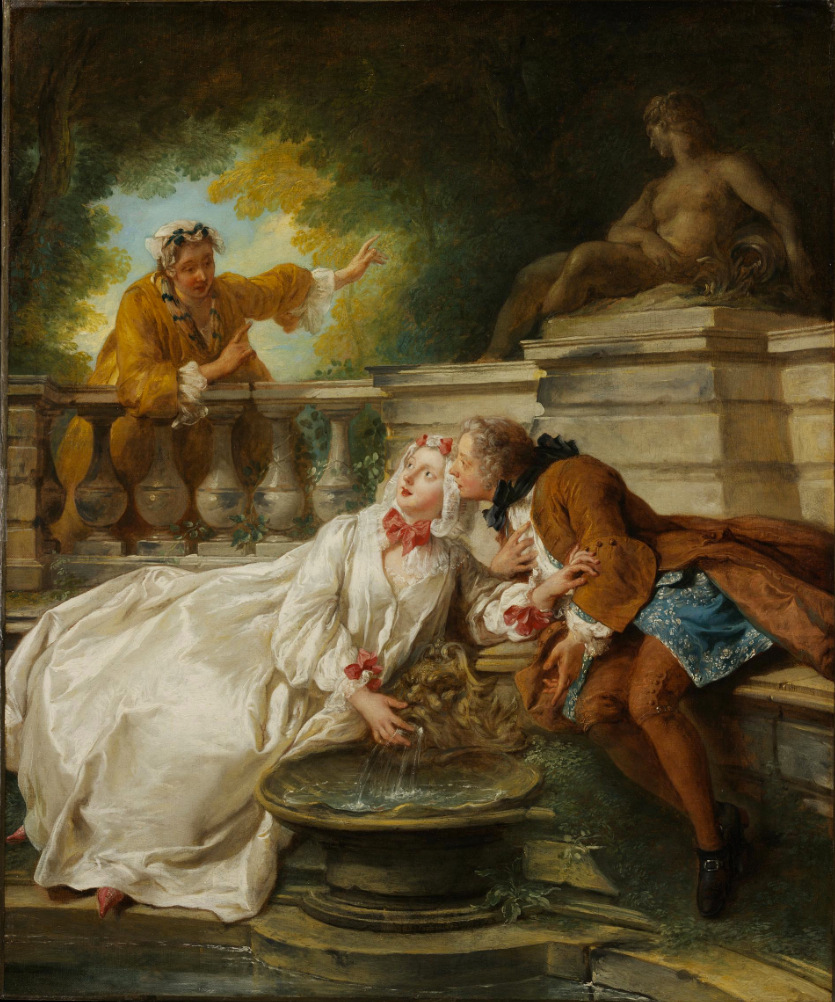
The Alarm or the Gouvernante Fidèle (1723)

While Watteau's 'fête galantes' were filled with a sense of mystery and timelessness, de Troy's tableaux de mode were intended to provide a more realistic depiction of contemporary fashions, pastimes and manners. He was able to capture in these compositions the more relaxed behavior of the higher social classes following the death of Louis XIV in 1715 as shown in new fashions and manners.

These compositions are believed to be based on de Troy's personal experiences as he was an active member of the fashionable world he depicted. The closeness to Watteau is evidenced by the fact that his The Alarm, or the Gouvernante Fidèle (1723, Victoria and Albert Museum, London) was attributed to Watteau in the 19th century.

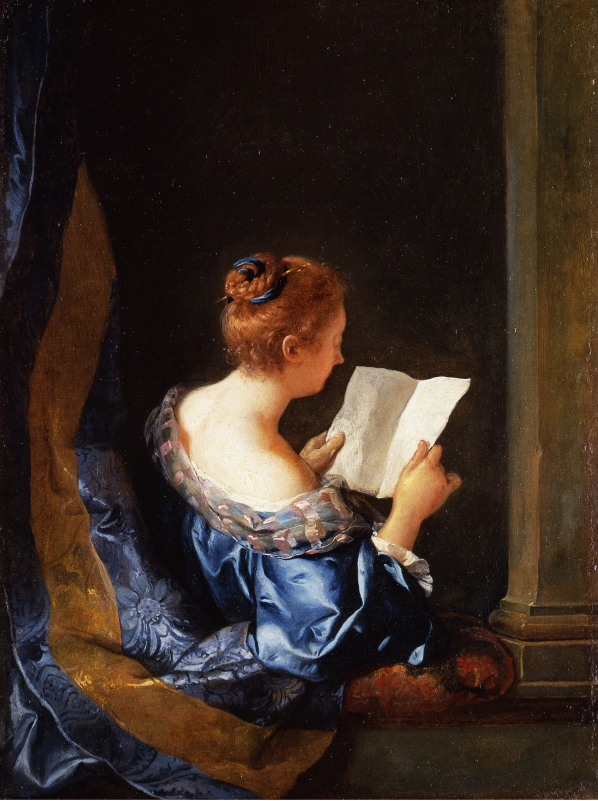
A Woman Reading (1723)

De Troy’s tableaux de mode responded to the artistic preferences of a new clientele for art in France: successful bankers and financiers representing a new bourgeois class. They also reflected the developing taste for a new sensuality, which was taken even further during the second half of the 17th century in the libertine philosophy and in texts such as Les Liaisons dangereuses by Choderlos de Laclos and the Philosophy in the Bedroom by Marquis de Sade.

=== Tapestry designs ===
Jean-François de Troy produced the designs for two sets of tapestries which were woven by the Gobelins. Each set consists of seven tapestries. One recounts the Story of Esther (1737–40) and the other the Story of Jason (1743–46). The Story of Esther designs were so successful that they were woven eight times in the 18th century. The cartoons for the tapestries were exhibited to great acclaim. In his tapestry designs de Troy abandoned narrative clarity in favour of a profusion of picturesque and anecdotal detail and brilliant colour effects.
