= John Jones (art collector) =

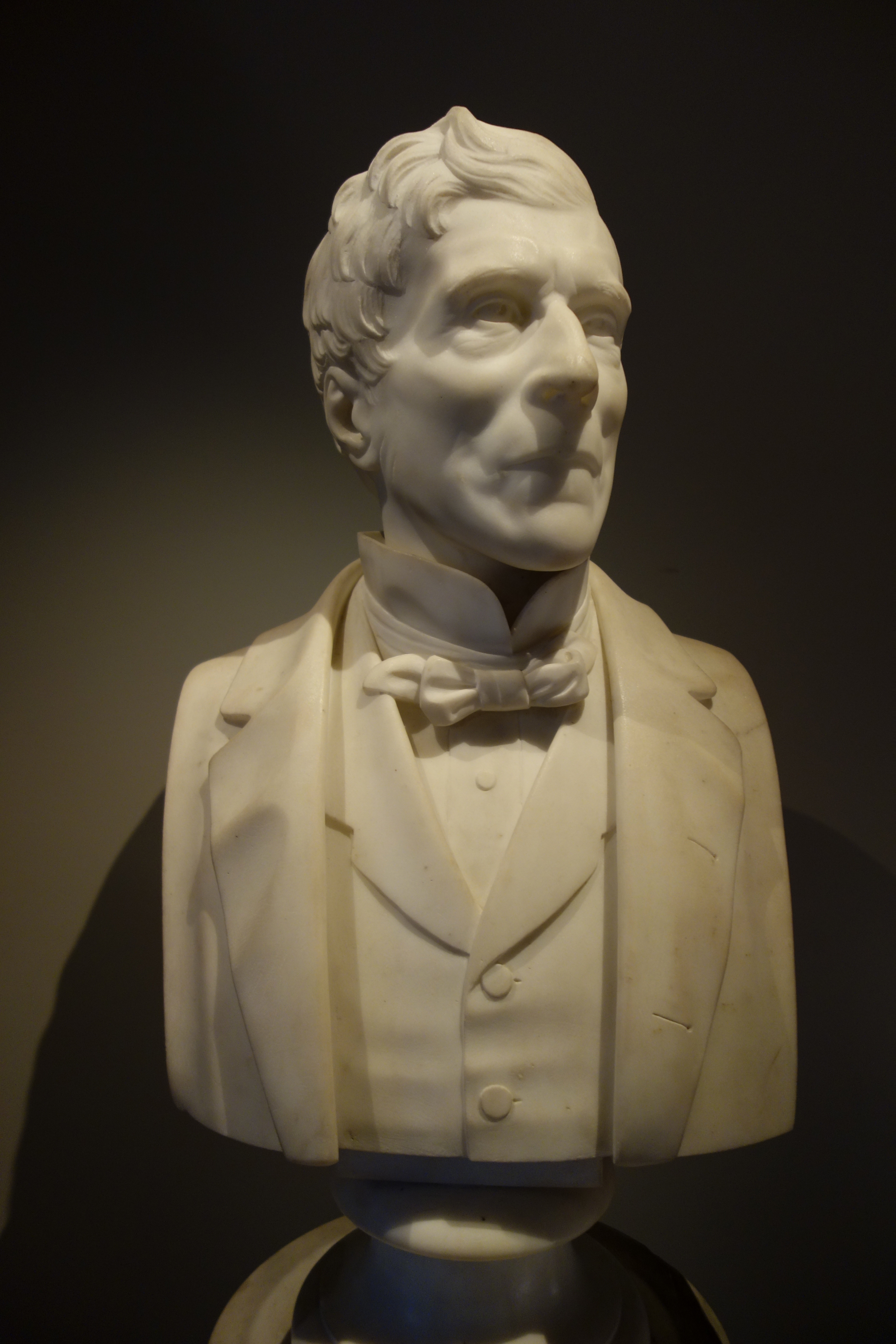
John Jones by John Lawlor

John Jones (c. 1798/1799 – 7 January 1882) was a British art collector. He bequeathed his collection to the South Kensington Museum (now the Victoria and Albert Museum). The collection is considered significant for its holdings of 18th-century French decorative arts.

== Early life ==
Jones was born in Middlesex. He later settled in London, becoming a tailor and clothier for the British Army. After amassing considerable wealth, he retired from business in 1850. He then devoted himself to collecting objets d'art, mostly French, which he displayed in his house in Piccadilly. A catalogue of his bequest to the South Kensington Museum was published in 1882.

The collection contains about 780 books and 1,034 other items, including 313 prints, 105 paintings, 137 portrait miniatures, 147 pieces of porcelain, and 135 pieces of furniture. It includes the first three Shakespeare folios as well as works by leading 18th-century French cabinet-makers, including Jean-François Oeben, Martin Carlin, Jean-François Leleu and Jean-Henri Riesener.

The French furniture comprises an escritoire of great value and technical merit which belonged to Marie Antoinette, marquetrie cabinets which are marvels of exquisite inlaying, and otherwise superbly delicate ornamentation. The carriage clock of Marie Antoinette has the charms of its associations.

== Bibliography ==
- "The Jones bequest to the South Kensington Museum", The Times, 12 December 1882.
- Handbook of the Jones Collection in the South Kensington Museum: With Portrait and Woodcuts, London: Published for the Committee of Council on Education by Chapman and Hall, 1883.
- Brief Guide to the Jones Collection, London: HMSO, 1922.
- O. Brackett, Catalogue of the Jones Collection. Part 1: Furniture, London: HMSO, 1922.
- Basil S. Long, Catalogue of the Jones Collection. Part 3: Paintings and Miniatures, London: HMSO, 1923.
- Catalogue of the Jones Collection. Part 2: Ceramics, Ormolu, Goldsmiths’ Work, Enamels, Sculpture, Tapestry, Books and Prints, London: HMSO, 1924.
- D. Sutton and others, "The Jones Collection in the V&A Museum", Apollo, no. 95, 1972, pp. 2–58.
- C. M. Kauffmann, "Jones, John (1798/9–1882)", Oxford Dictionary of National Biography, Oxford: Oxford University Press, 2004.
