= Anne and Jehanne =

1894 painting by Laura Leroux-Revault

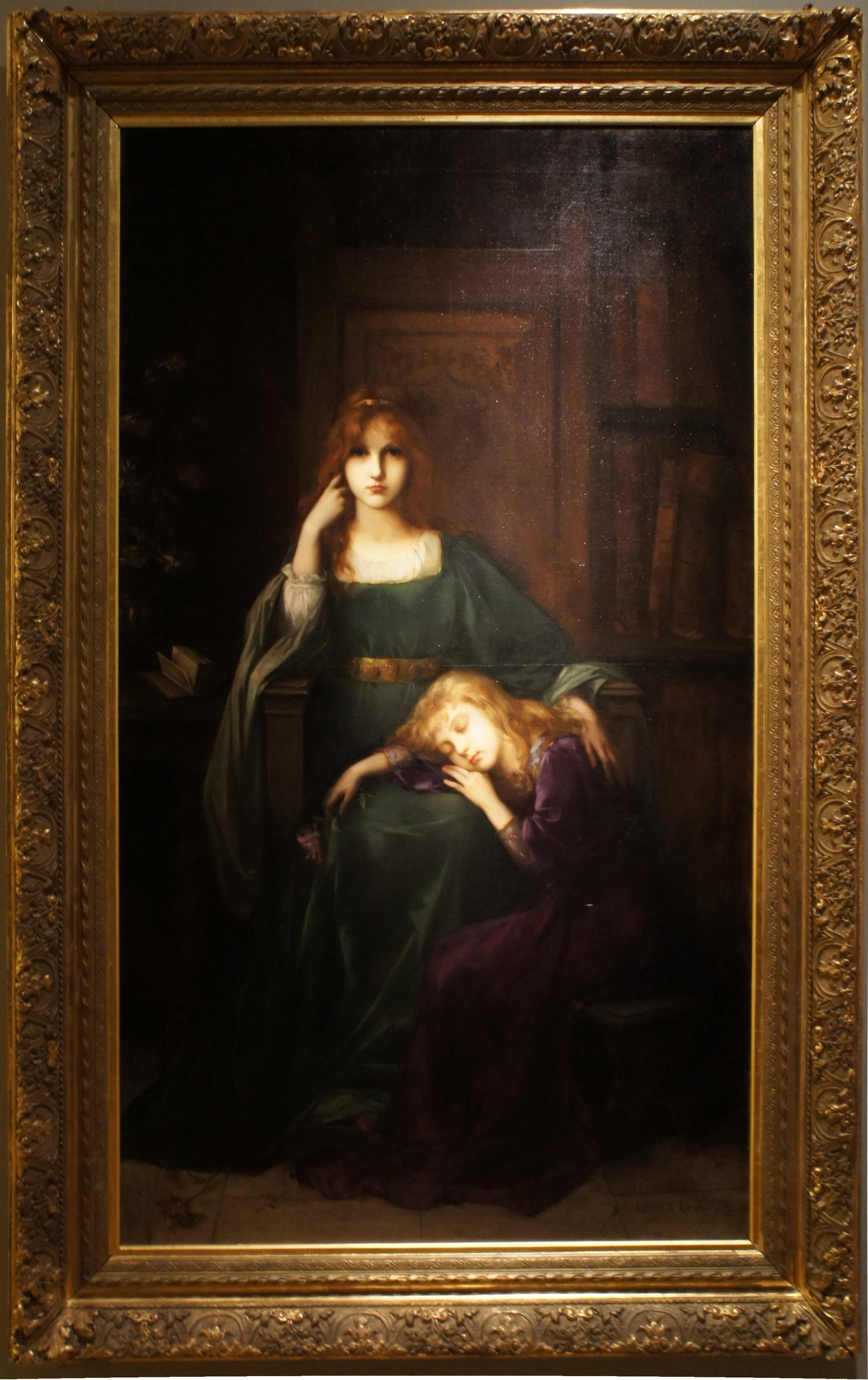
Anne and Jehanne (1894) by Laura Leroux-Revault

Anne and Jehanne is an 1894 signed oil on canvas painting by Laura Leroux-Revault, a French painter from the Lorraine region. It is now in the musée des Beaux-Arts de Nancy, whose collections it entered on 7 January 1896 as a state deposit. First exhibited at the Paris Salon of 1894, it is signed by the artist at bottom right. She was born at Dun-sur-Meuse in 1872, daughter of the painter Louis Hector Leroux (1829–1900), and died in 1936. It was restored in 1998.
