= Laura Leroux-Revault =

French painter (1872–1936)

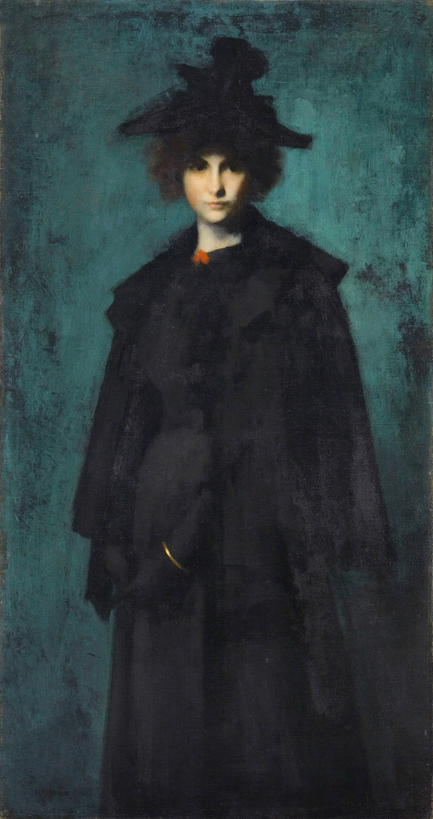
- Born: Maria Laura Desiderata Le Roux; 14 September 1872
- Died: June 1936 (aged 63)

Laura Leroux-Revault (née Maria Laura Desiderata Le Roux) (14 September 1872 – June 1936) was a French artist and painter, trained at the Académie Julian art school in Paris. Her first teacher was her father, the painter Louis Hector Leroux. Her passion for Shakespeare and for the Middle Ages gained expression in her paintings which often show women dressed or positioned in ways that evoke medieval themes.

== Early life and Family ==
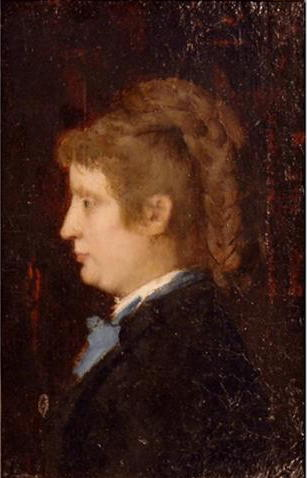
Jean-Jacques Henner -Clelia Leroux (mother)

Maria Laura Desiderata Le Roux was born on 14 September 1872 at Dun-sur-Meuse. She was the daughter of Giuditta Clelia Casali and Louis Hector Leroux (1829–1900), a successful French painter.

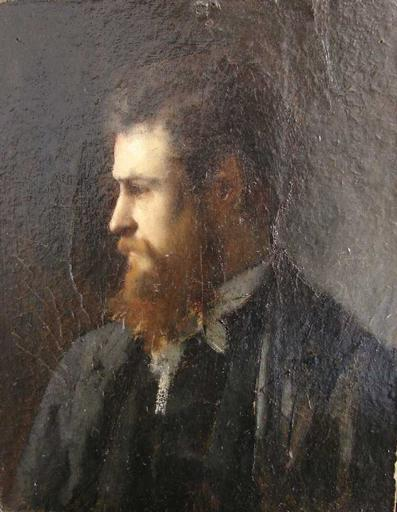
Jean-Jacques Henner - Hector Leroux (father)

Her parents met when her maternal grandfather was the doctor who treated her father for wounds he received when serving in the Francs-tireurs de la Seine in the Battle of Buzenval, where his leg was broken by a projectile. She had a younger brother Nicholas. Their father painted a portrait of the siblings in 1888.

Underappreciated, one observer of her work called her an artist "passed over by posterity," with her career often linked to her father, male mentors, or later husband, the politician Louis Revault, who spent part of his early career in Brazil and who established a chocolate factory upon returning to France.

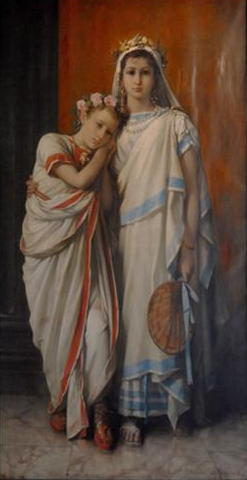
Louis Hector Leroux--Frère et Soeur--1888 Nicholas (left) and Laura Leroux (right)

== Career ==
Laura Leroux trained at the Académie Julian art school in Paris, which allowed women to attend at a time when the École de Beaux Arts otherwise excluded women on the grounds that nude men possed as models. Initially a pupil of her father, she then trained under Jules Lefebvre and Jean-Jacques Henner. The two artists were friends of her father. Henner was one of the rare male artists who allowed women to work in his studio in a role other than as models. In 1898, Henner painted her portrait, which the Musée des Beaux-Arts in Angers conserves on behalf of the Musée d'Orsay in Paris.

The Musée des Beaux-Arts of Nancy displays one of her major works, Anne et Jehanne (1894) which reflects her interest in the Middle Ages.

== Exhibitions ==
Leroux-Revault exhibited works with the Société des Artistes Français.

- 1892: Paris, Salon des artistes français: Fille de Roy (titre de l'inventaire), No. 1067.
- 1894: Paris, Salon des artistes français: Anne et Jehanne, No. 1158.
- 1896: Paris, Salon des artistes français: Jehanne Ire de Naples, No. 1242, et L'Heure de l'attente, No. 1243.

== Selected known works ==
- Bar-le-Duc, Musée barrois: Fille de Roy [titre de l'inventaire], 1892, oil on canvas, stolen during the night of 20 or 21 August 1985, current location unknown.
- Nancy, musée des Beaux-Arts: Anne et Jehanne, 1894, oil on canvas.
- Verdun, musée de la Princerie: L'Attente ou L'Heure de l'attente, entre 1890 et 1903, oil on canvas.
- Jehanne Ire de Naples (Joan I of Naples), painting exhibited in 1896 in the Paris' Salon des Artistes français (Salon of French Artists). Current location Philadelphia, offered for sale on eBay.
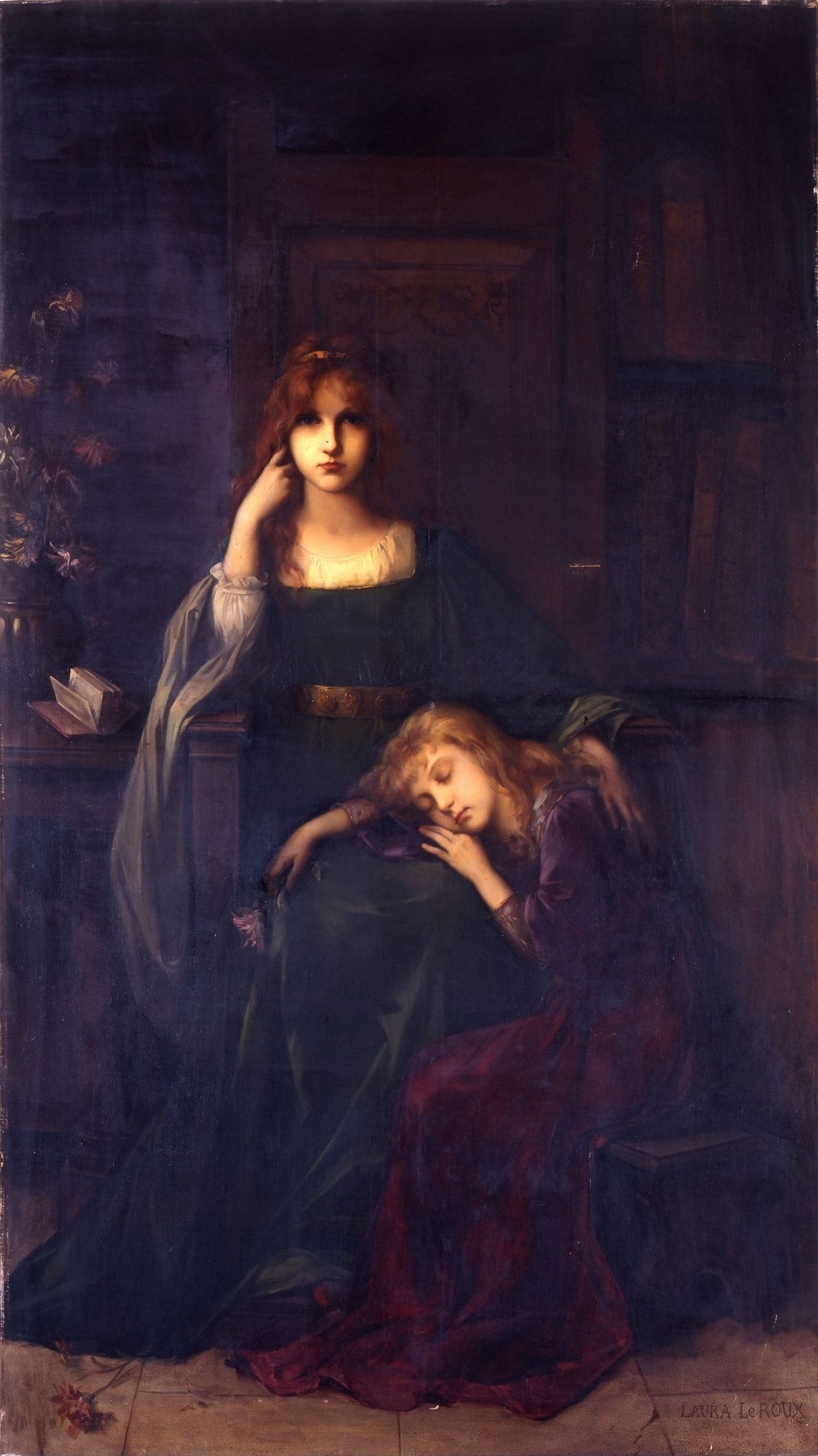
Anne et Jehanne (1894), musée des Beaux-Arts de Nancy.

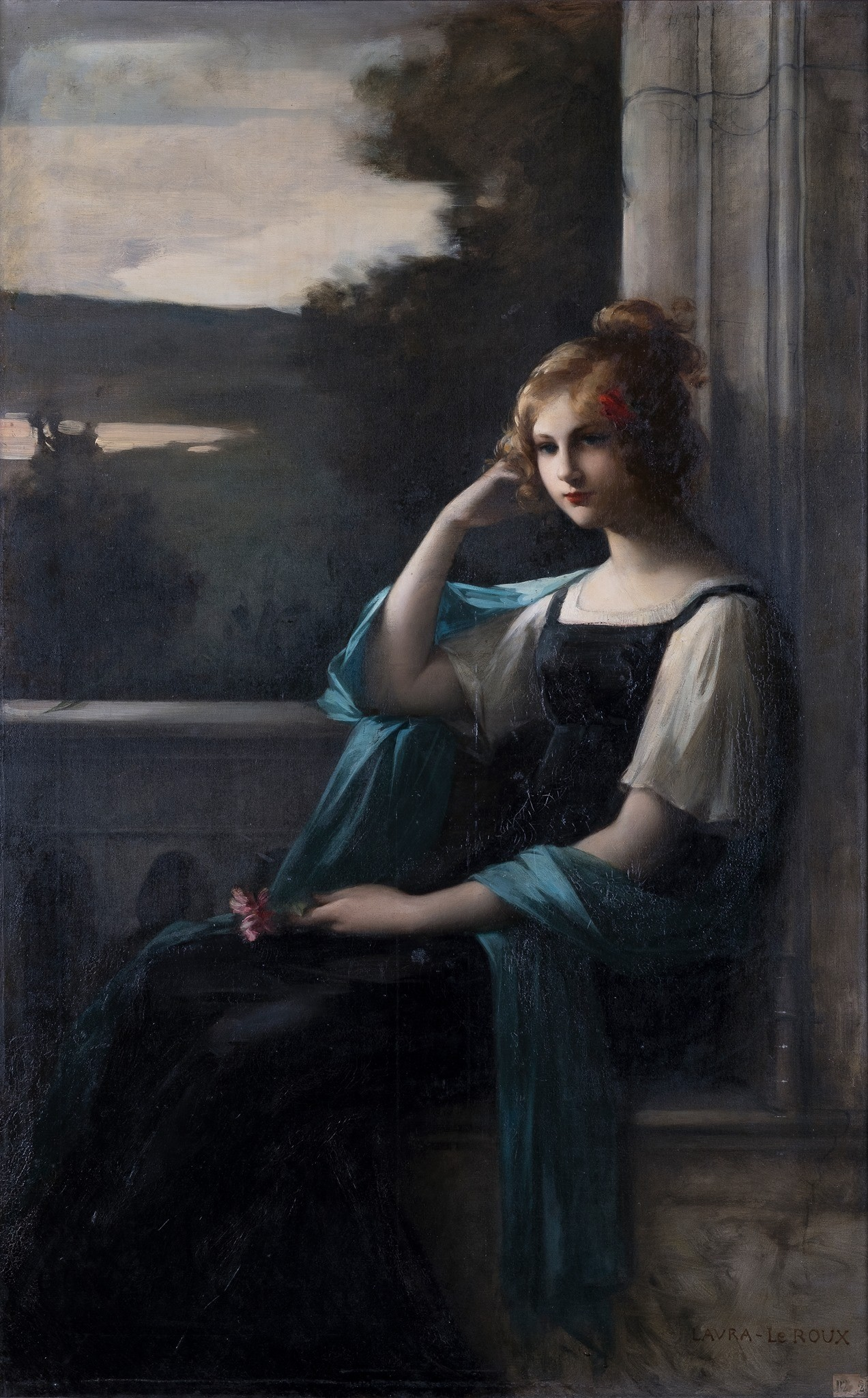
L'Attente (self portrait) (1896), musée de la Princerie

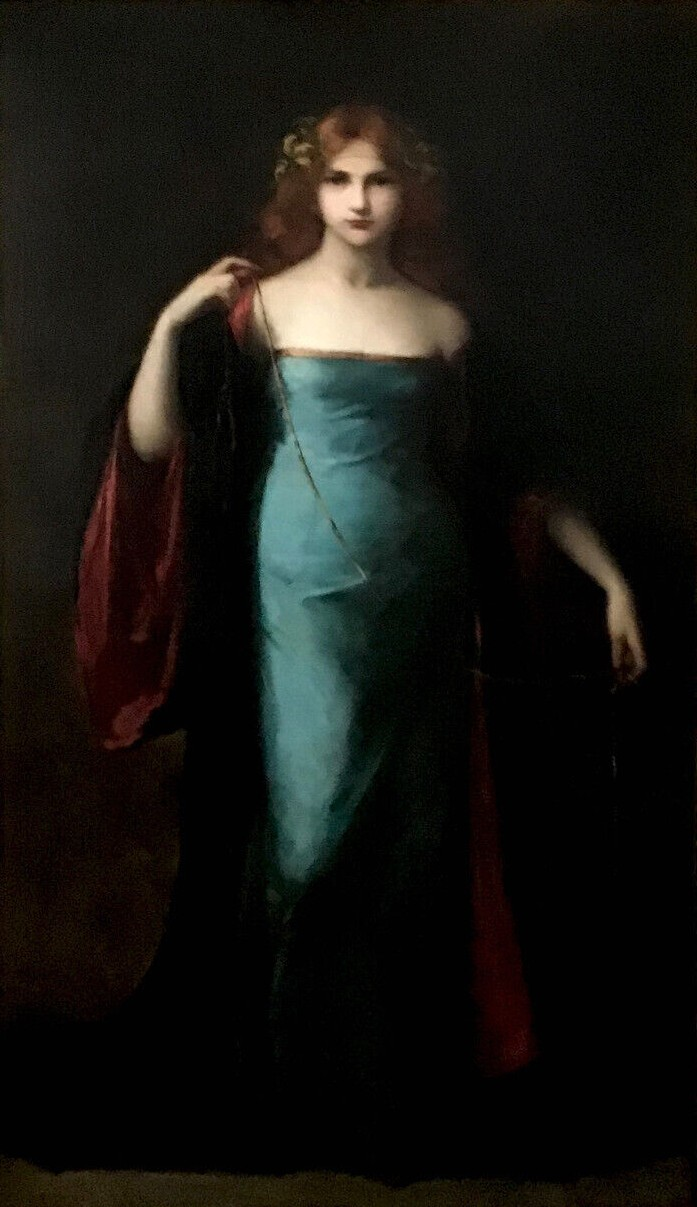
Jehanne Ire de Naples, 1896

== Portraits of Leroux-Revault by other artists ==
- Louis Hector Leroux, Portrait de Laura en vestale, Verdun, musée de la Princerie, inv. 81.1.261.
- Louis Hector Leroux, Portrait de femme [Laura Leroux], Verdun, musée de la Princerie, inv. 81.1.262.
- Jean-Jacques Henner, Portrait de Laura Leroux, vers 1898, Verdun, musée de la Princerie, inv. 81.1.79
- Jean-Jacques Henner, Portrait de Mademoiselle Laura Leroux, 1898, musée des Beaux-Arts d'Angers (dépôt du musée d'Orsay), MBA 830 Dép.

== Personal life ==
In 1898, she married Louis Revault (1866–1950), a French industrialist and chocolate manufacturer who later became a député in Paris. She became known as Laura Leroux-Revault.

Laura Leroux-Revault died in June 1936 in Auzéville in Argonne.
