= Étienne-Prosper Berne-Bellecour =

French painter (1838–1910)

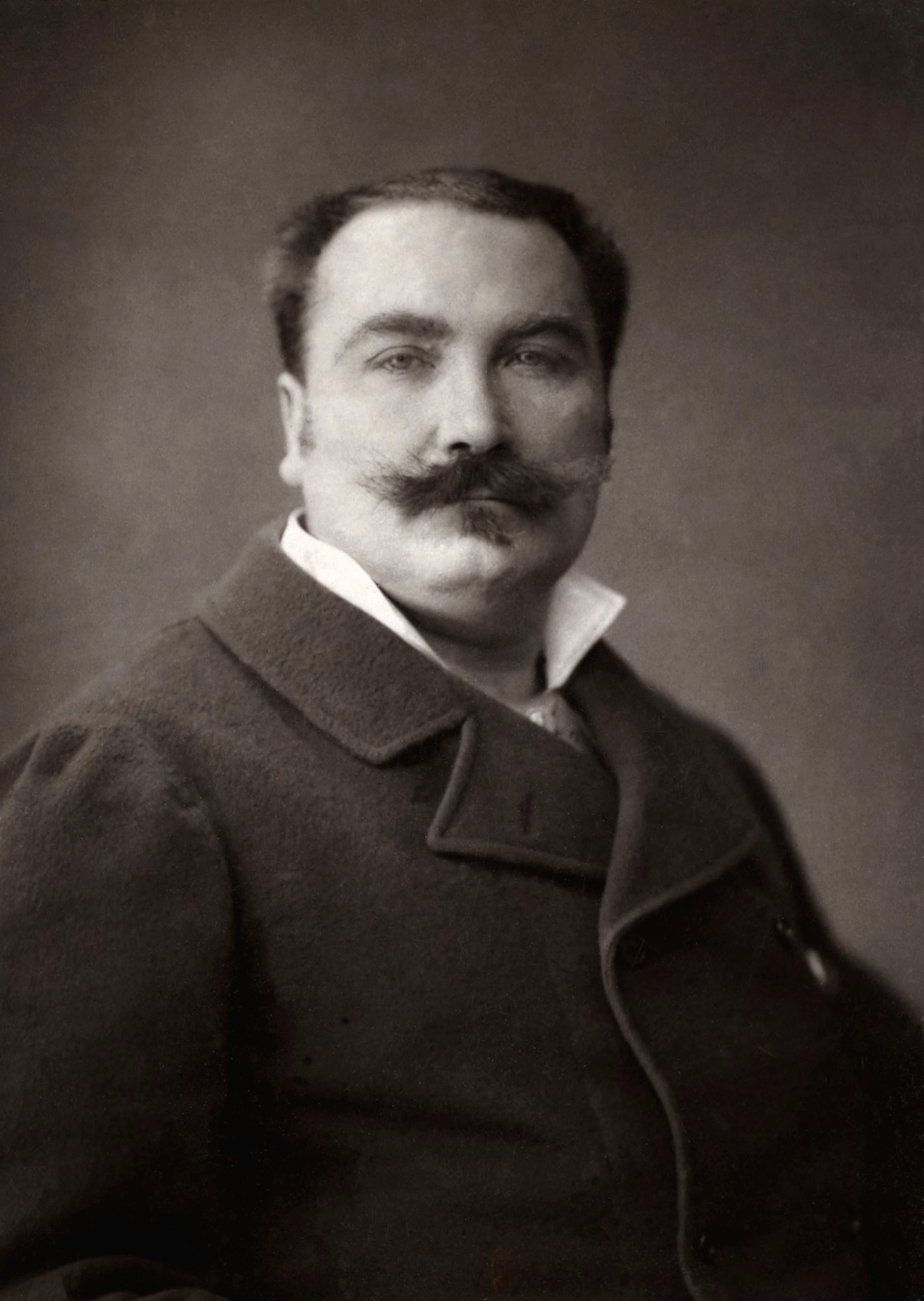
- 1882 photo
- Born: 29 June 1838; Boulogne-sur-Mer, France
- Died: 29 November 1910 (aged 72); Paris, France
- Known for: Painting

Étienne-Prosper Berne-Bellecour (29 June 1838 – 29 November 1910) was a French painter, printmaker, and illustrator. He was known for his war art.

== Biography ==
Berne-Bellecour was born on 29 June 1838 in Boulogne, France. He studied under François-Édouard Picot and Félix-Joseph Barrias. He initially painted landscapes and portraits. He worked in photography to support himself while he studied. He also attended the École des Beaux-Arts and competed for the Prix de Rome in 1859.

Berne-Bellecour, along with his brother-in-law Jehan Georges Vibert, produced a comedic play titled "La Tribune Mécanique" which was performed at the Palais Royal in 1862. He showcased his works at several Salons in the 1860s and later.

He won a prize for photography at the Universal Exposition of 1867. In 1868, Vibert encouraged Berne-Bellecour to devote himself entirely to painting.

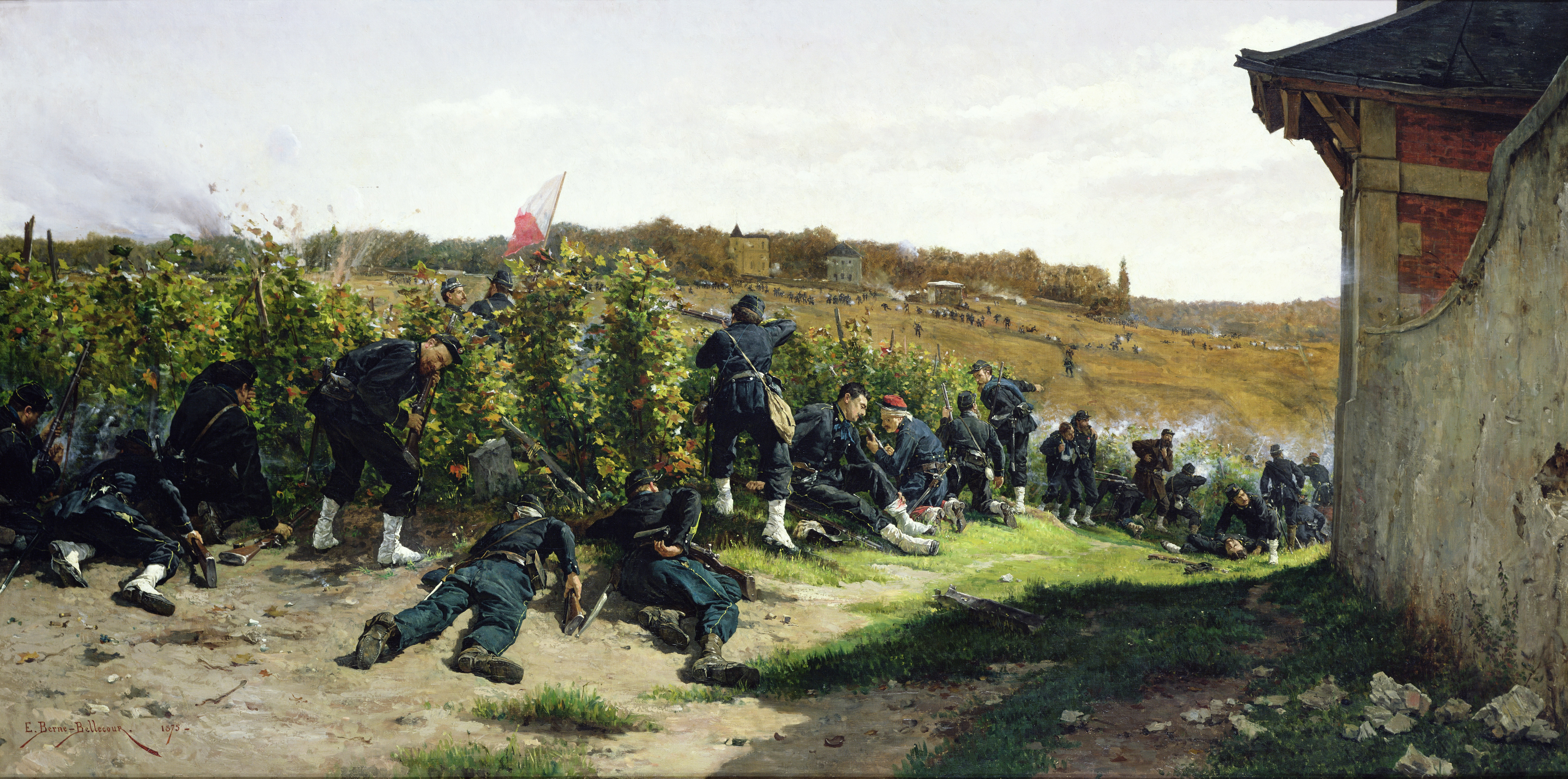
Berne-Bellecour, Les Tirailleurs de la Seine au combat de Rueil-Malmaison (1875).

Berne-Bellecour, Vibert, and Alexander Louis Leloir went on a trip to Africa in 1870, later returning to fight in the Franco-Prussian War. They served in the Francs-tireurs de la Seine alongside fellow artists Hector Leroux, Gustave Jacquet, Jules Ferdinand Jacquemart, and the sculptor Joseph Cuvelier. "They fought bravely at Malmaison" in the Battle of Buzenval. Berne-Bellecour depicted the engagement in a painting made five years later. He won a medal for gallantry under fire and went on to paint many military subjects.

He also practiced as a sculptor and an etcher. He was named a Chevalier in the French Legion of Honor in 1878.

Berne-Bellecour died in Paris on 29 November 1910. His son Jean-Jacques Berne-Bellecour (1874–1939) was also a military painter.

== Gallery ==
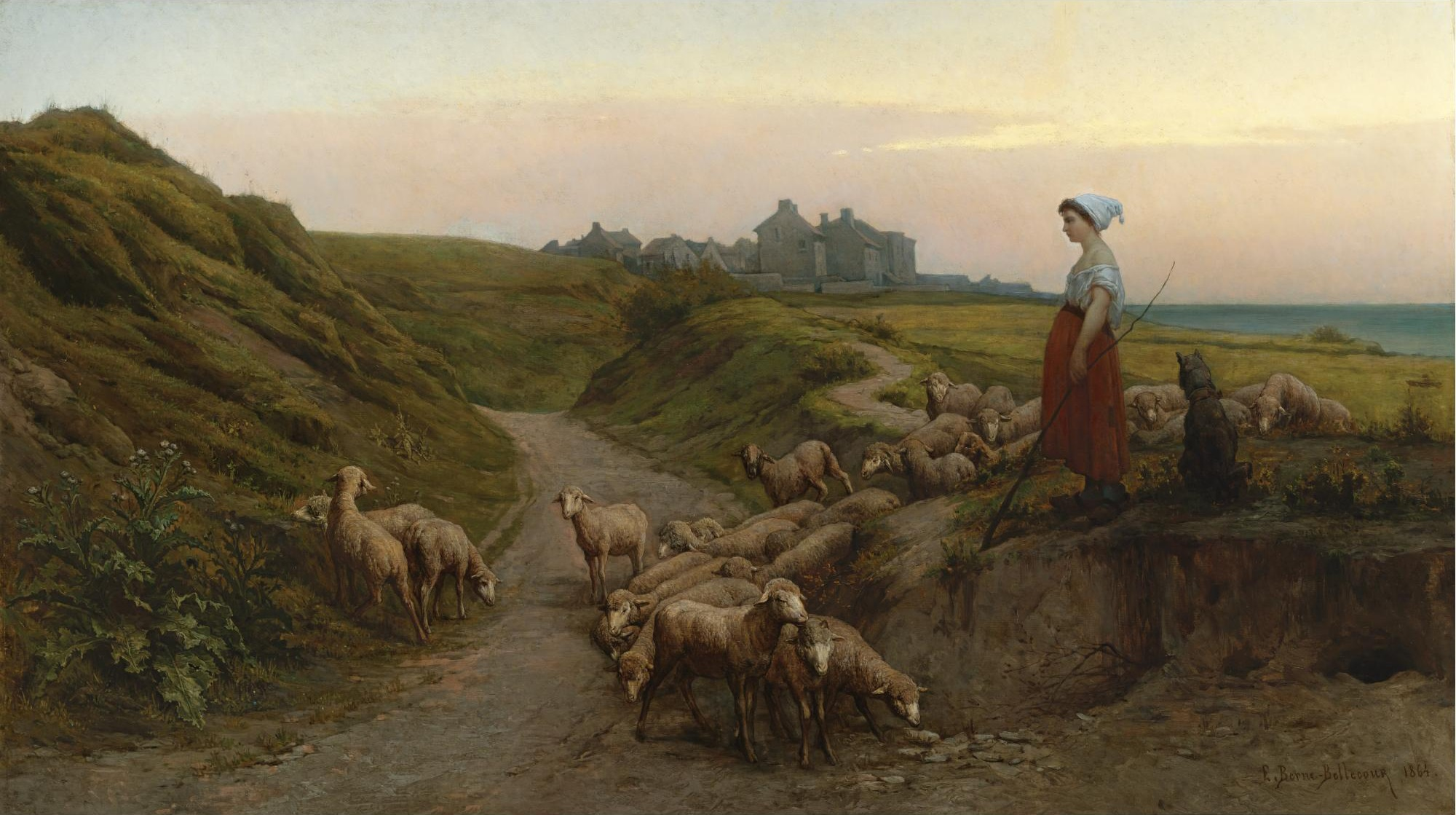
Low Road on the Coast of Normandy (1864)

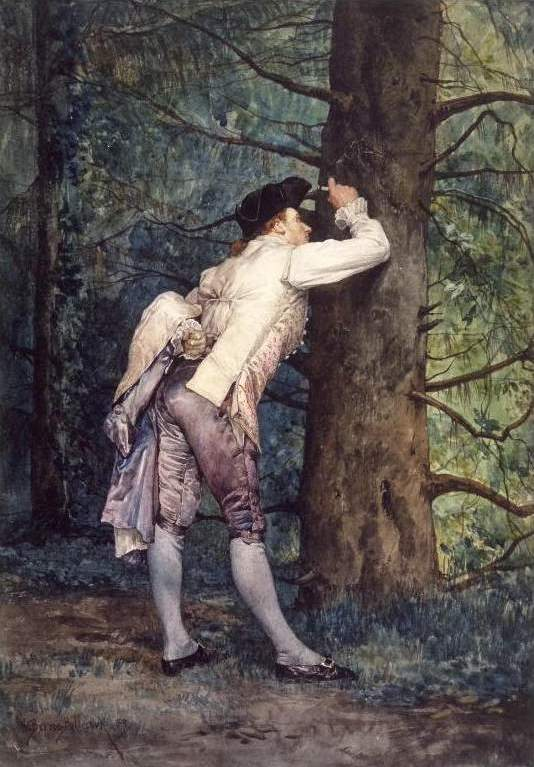
The Lover (1869)

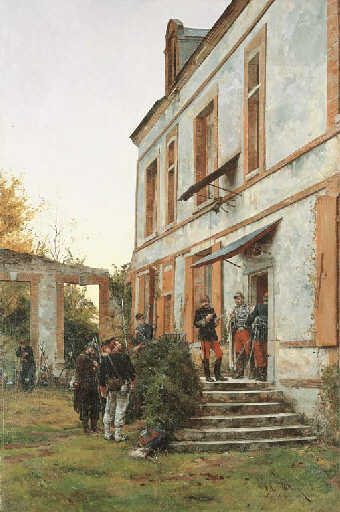
Soldiers resting (1883)

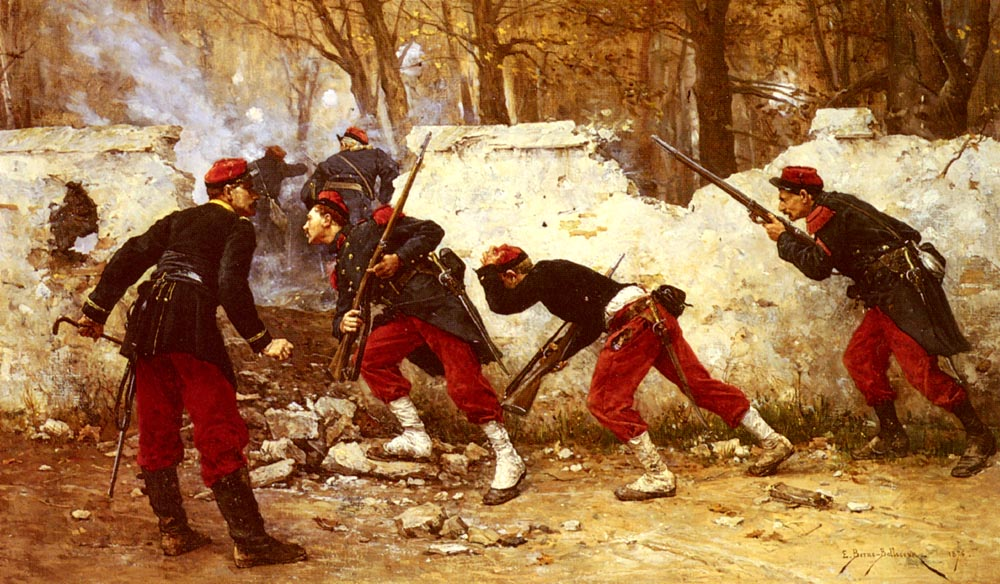
L'Attaque (1874)

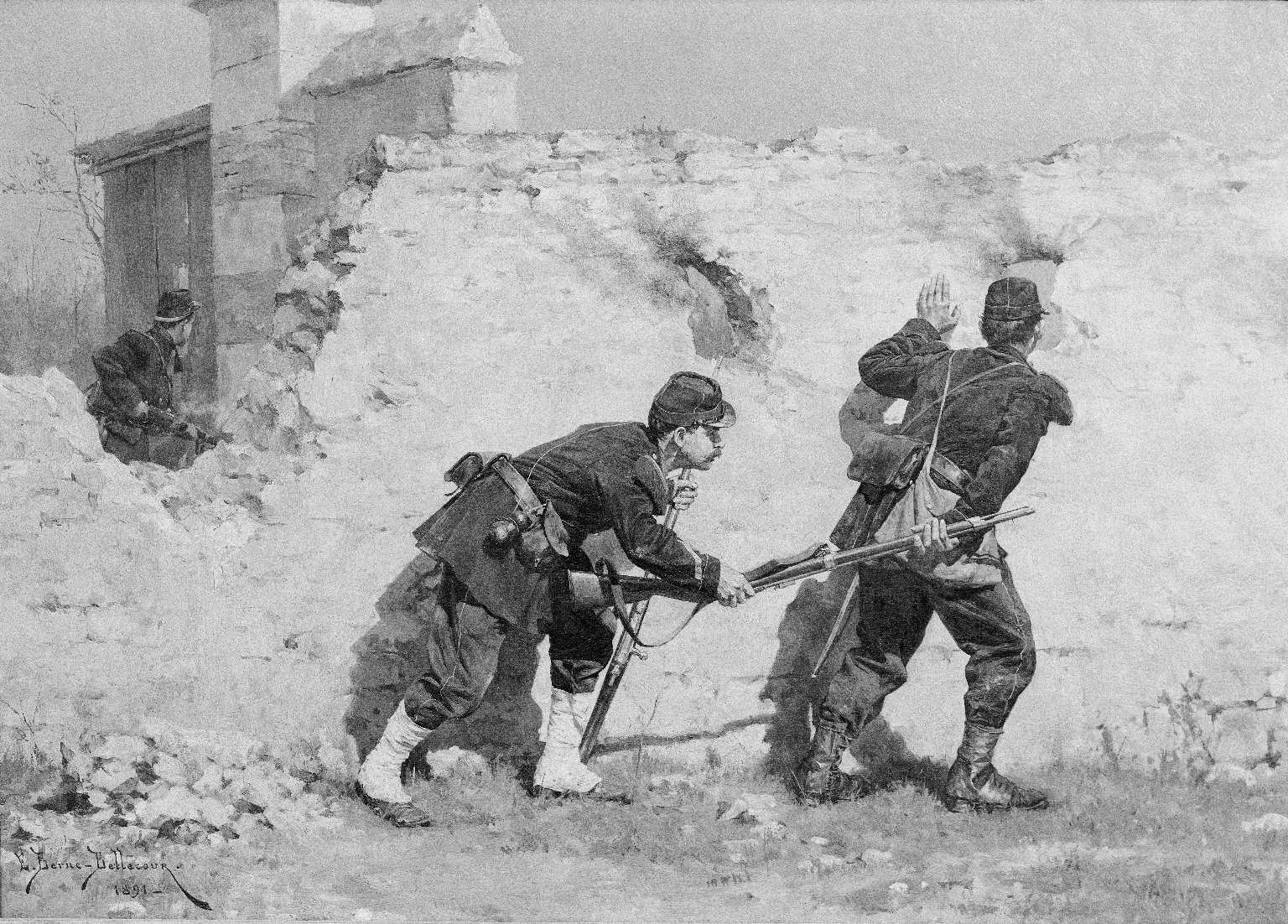
Picket Guards (1891)
