= Louis Hector Leroux =

French painter

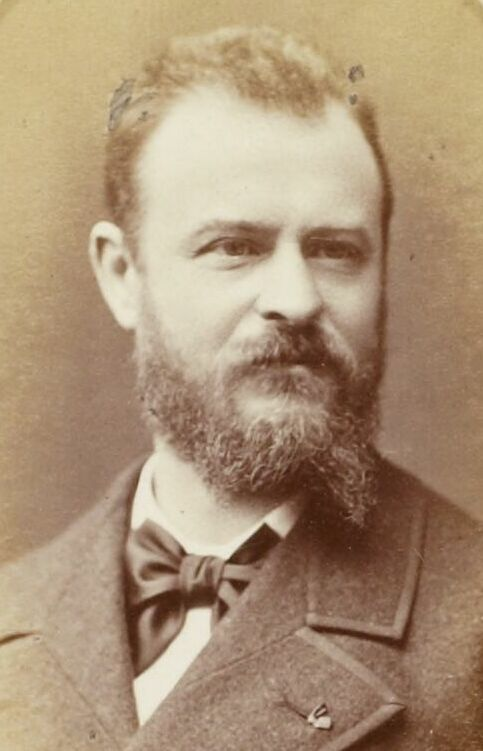
- Hector Leroux, c. 1875
- Born: 27 December 1829; Verdun, France
- Died: 11 November 1900 (aged 70); Angers, France
- Other name: spelling variant: Le Roux
- Education: École des beaux-arts de Paris, François-Édouard Picot
- Occupation: painter
- Known for: paintings of Vestal virgins
- Movement: Academic art; Caldarrosti; Néo-Grecs
- Relatives: Laura Leroux-Revault, daughter
- Awards: Premier Second Grand Prix de Rome, 1857; Chevalier of the Legion of Honor, 1877

Signature
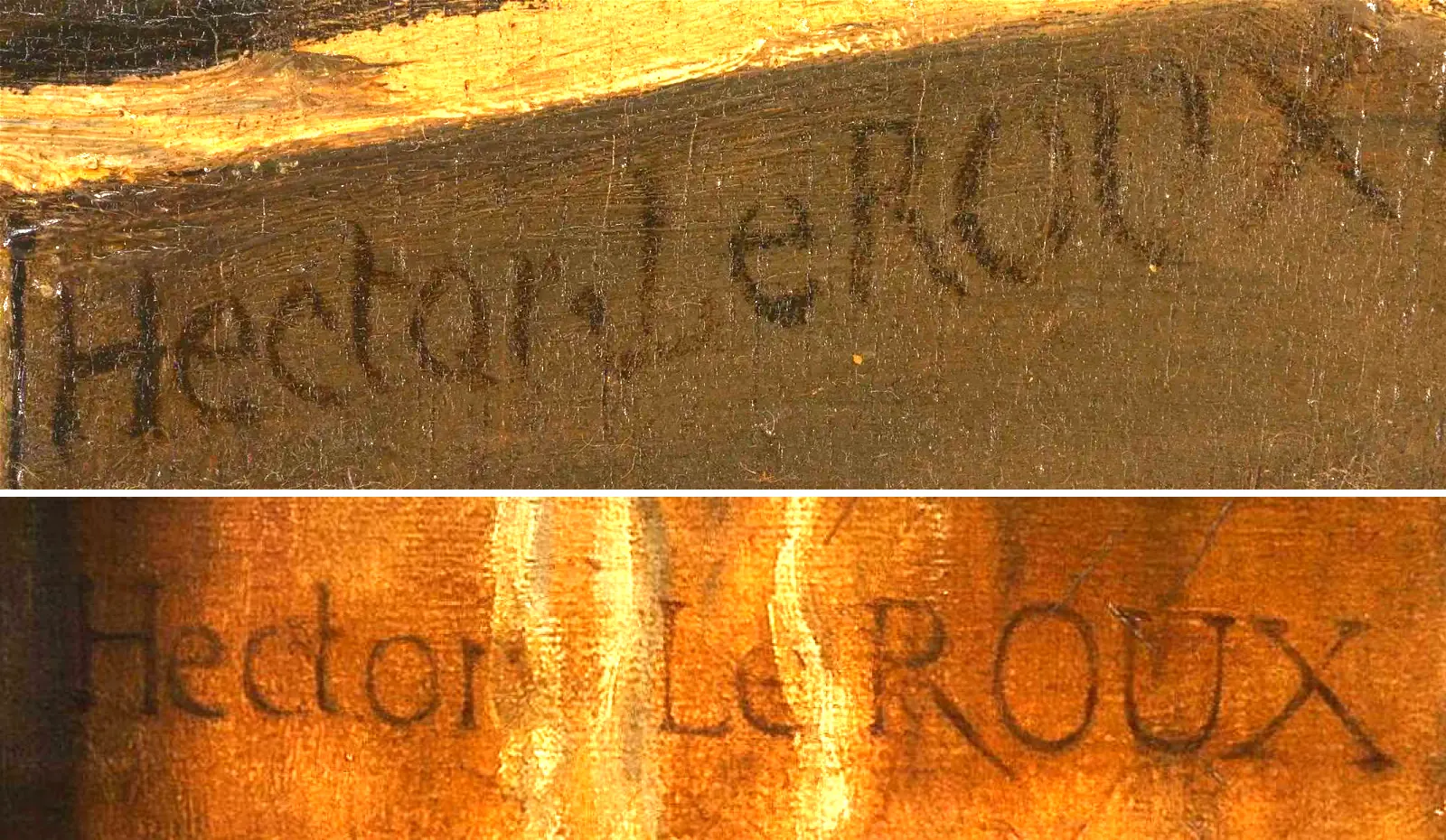

Louis Hector Leroux (27 December 1829, Verdun-11 November 1900, Angers) was a French painter in the academic style, affiliated by critics with the Néo-Grecs movement in art. He specialized in meticulously researched paintings of ancient Rome, especially depictions of women. He was best known for a series of some thirty paintings which spanned his entire career, depicting Vestal virgins. His daughter, Laura Leroux-Revault, was also a painter.

== Education, years in Rome ==
Born into a family of modest means in Verdun, Leroux was apprenticed to his father, a barber, before attending drawing classes at the Collège de Verdun, taught by a painter trained in the workshops of Antoine-Jean Gros and Michel Martin Drolling, who quickly spotted his talent. From 1849 to 1855, first the General Council of the Meuse and then the city of Verdun granted him annual scholarships to pursue his education in Paris.

In 1849, at the age of twenty, he entered the École des beaux-arts de Paris and for eleven years studied in the atelier of François-Édouard Picot, where he won medals for drawing, landscape, and historical composition. It was in Picot's studio that he met his lifelong friend Jean-Jacques Henner. He supported himself by working as a lithographer and as an illustrator for fashion journals.

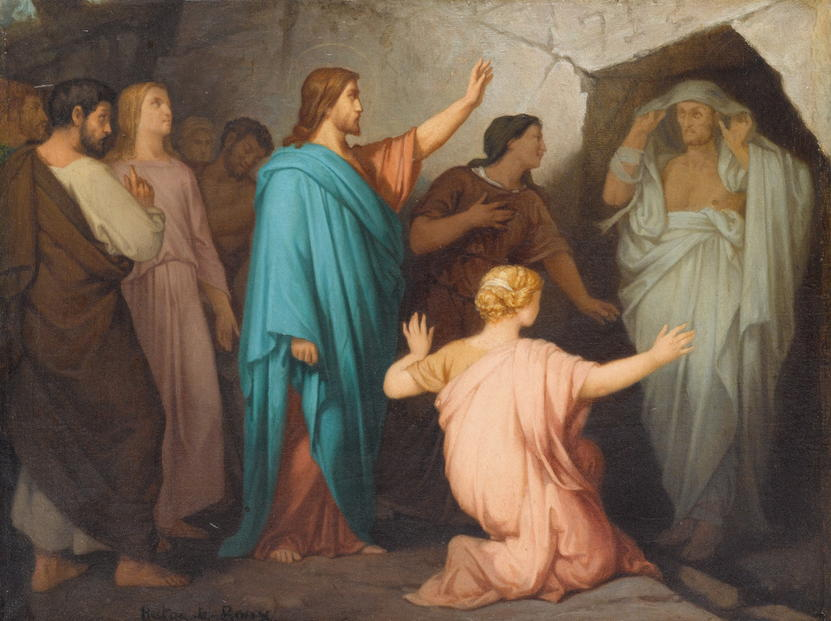
La Résurrection de Lazare, Leroux's second-place entry to the Prix de Rome in 1857; Musée d’Orsay

In 1857, 1858, and 1859 he entered the annual competition for the Prix de Rome, administered by the Institut de France, which awarded the Grand Prix winner a multi-year scholarship to study and paint in Rome. He came close; his painting for 1857, when the assigned subject was the resurrection of Lazarus, received the Premier Second Grand Prix. After 1859, Leroux could no longer compete for the prize, which was restricted to entrants under the age of thirty. Determined that Leroux should go to Rome, his master Picot, along with Hippolyte Flandrin and Léon Halévy of the Institut, arranged for Leroux to receive a commission in 1860 from the École des beaux-arts de Paris to produce a copy of Titian's Sacred and Profane Love at the Galleria Borghese in Rome. The commission paid for his travel and provided lodging at the French Academy in Rome, alongside the winners of the Prix de Rome.

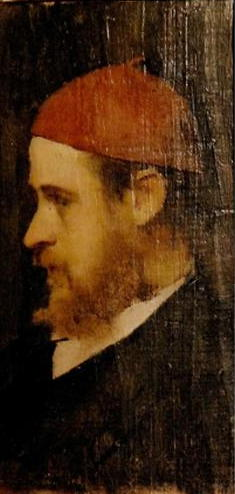
Leroux painted by Henner in Rome, 1861

Leroux arrived in Rome on March 12, 1860. At the Villa Medici he was welcomed by his friend Henner, who had won the Prix de Rome in 1858, and subsequently met and befriended Henri-Michel-Antoine Chapu (Prix de Rome, 1855), Jules Joseph Lefebvre (Prix de Rome, 1861), Léon Bonnat, and Tony Robert-Fleury. In 1861, this group of friends, along with numerous other French artists, architects, musicians, and sculptors in Rome, formed a group called the Caldarrosti (Italian for grilled chestnuts), which met for annual banquets in Paris for many years afterwards.

After his copy of Titian was completed and sent to Paris, Leroux stayed on in Rome, supporting himself, alongside Henner, by painting picturesque scenes for the foreign tourists. He and Henner also traveled beyond Rome, including trips to Pompeii, immersing themselves in the landscapes, art, and archeology of Italy. "My path opened before me; I was fated for antiquity," Leroux later said. "There I was in Rome, surrounded by history, and it would have been hard for me not to follow my calling."

Leroux lived seventeen years in Rome, with excursions across Italy and beyond to Greece, Asia Minor, Turkey, and Egypt, as well as some return trips to France. In 1871 he married a young Italian, Giuditta Clelia Casali.

== Painter of Vestals ==
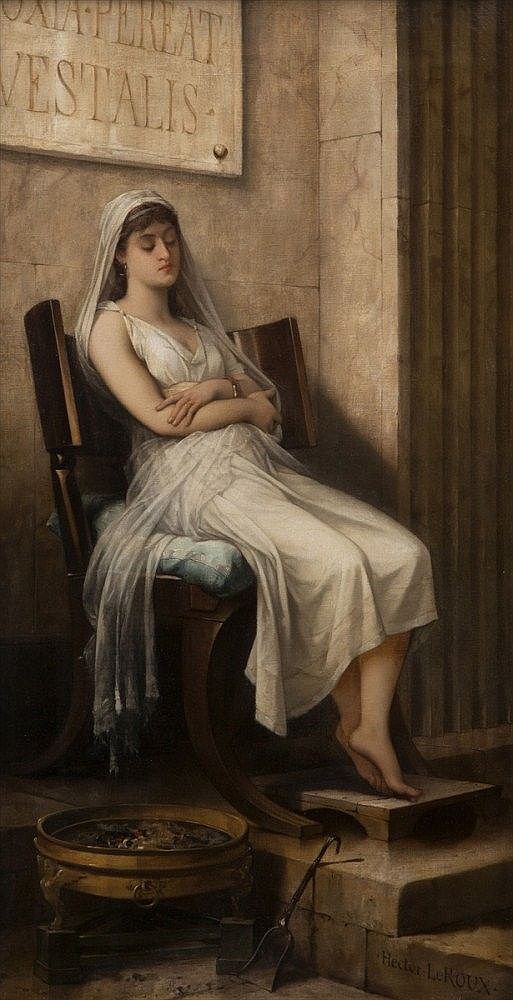
Vestale Endormie (1880), private collection

In 1863, at the age of 33, Leroux debuted at the Paris Salon with two paintings: Croyantes ("Believers," also known as Invocation to the Goddess Hygieia) and Une Nouvelle Vestale. Both were set in the ancient world, and both depicted women in religious contexts. Croyantes shows two women helping an ailing supplicant to approach a statue of a goddess in hopes of obtaining a divine cure, while Une Nouvelle Vestale depicts a candidate for the chaste life of a keeper of the holy flame of Vesta, protector of the city of Rome. In following years, Leroux would return repeatedly to both themes.

The idea to paint a Vestal did not originate with Leroux, but from a commission he received from the École des beaux-arts de Paris that specified the subject. "Chance made me talk about these virgins from my first painting," he would later say.

I have always returned to them, first out of gratitude and then out of sympathy. I collected the scattered fragments of their lives as I found them in Dionysius of Halicarnassus, Plutarch, Virgil, Horace, Ovid, Tacitus, Suetonius, Livy, Valerius Maximus, Justus Lipsius, and other authors who have since become my only companions.

Leroux became best known for his paintings of Vestals (some thirty between 1863 and 1899), which were warmly received by critics. Louis Ernault wrote:

Everything pertaining to the Vestal virgins has found in M. Le Roux an illustrator and historian. He shows them to us in the performance of all the functions of their virginal priesthood, sometimes rekindling the symbolic flame on the burning altar; sometimes invoking the goddess; sometimes sitting on the steps of their temple; and sometimes walking in white processions in the countryside with vast horizons...I love these chaste and proud girls of the great Roman aristocracy, charged with watching over the eternal fire of their goddess, and smothering in their marble bosoms the flames of all mortal love."

His final painting submitted to the Paris Salon, in 1899, the year before his death, closed the long series devoted to Vestals with a grim finis. It was titled, La gardienne du Champ scélérat, lieu de sépulture des Vestales enterrées vives, à Rome ("Guardian of the Crime-Stained Field, Graveyard of Vestal Virgins Buried Alive, in Rome." The punishment for a Vestal who broke her vow of chastity was to be entombed alive.)

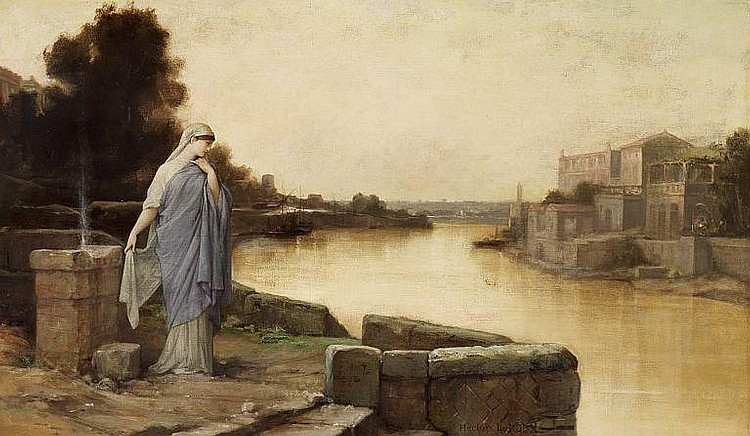
A Vestal on the bank of the Tiber (undated), private collection

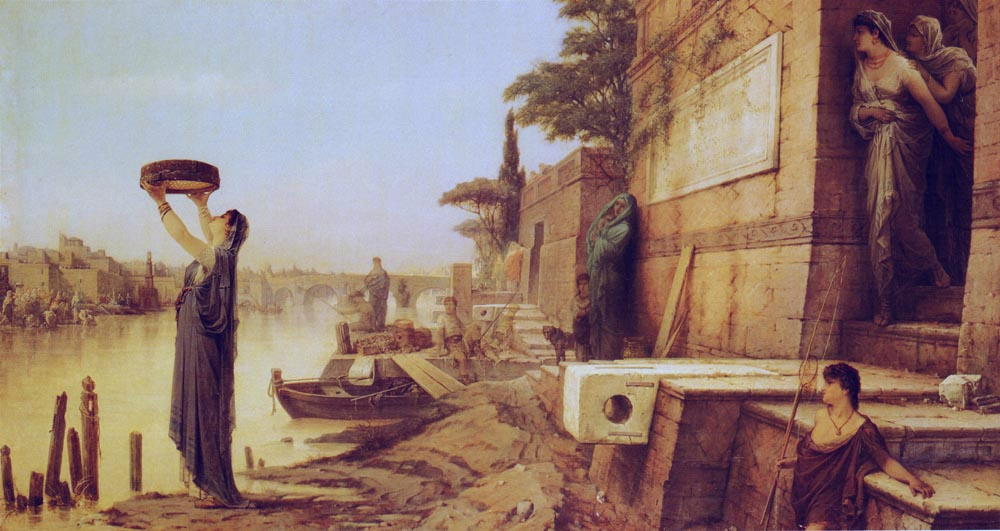
La Vestale Tuccia (1874), location unknown

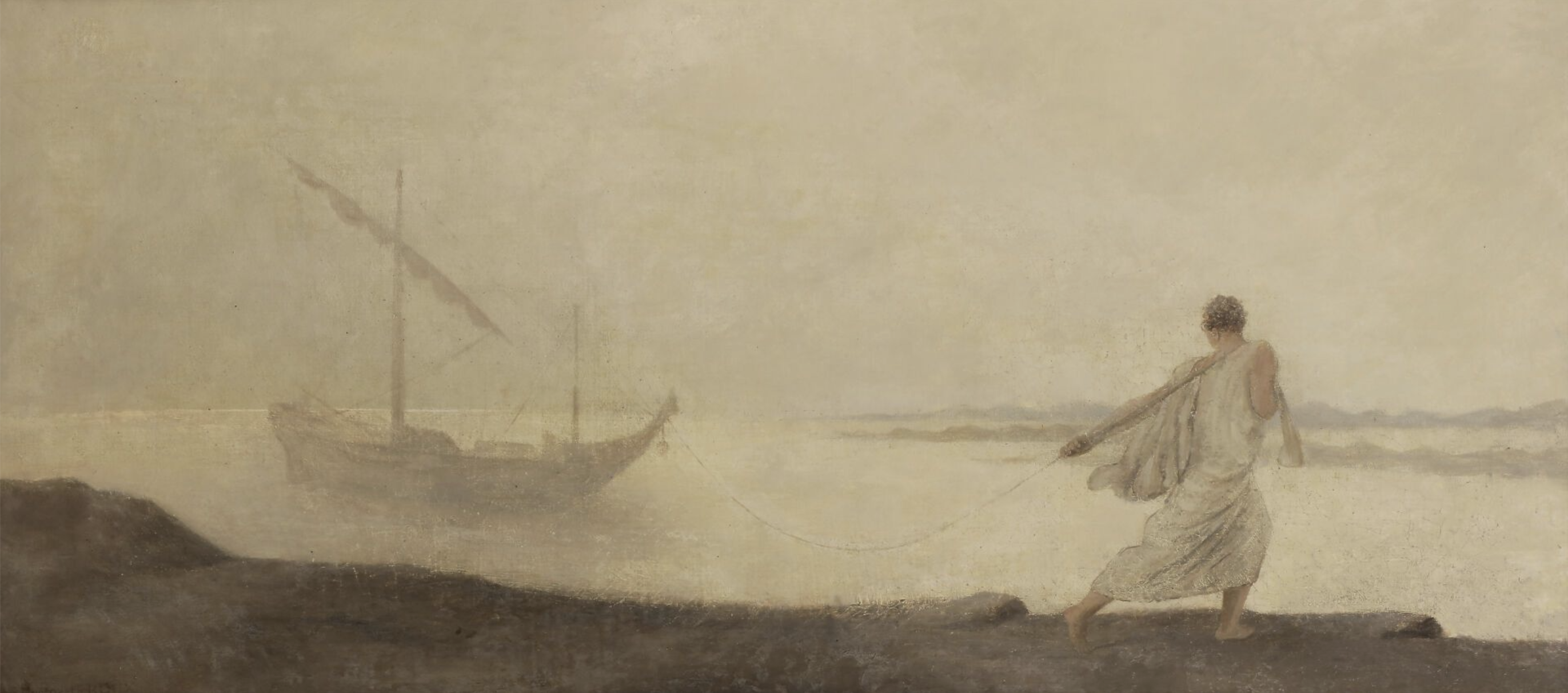
La Vestale Claudia Quinta (1877), private collection

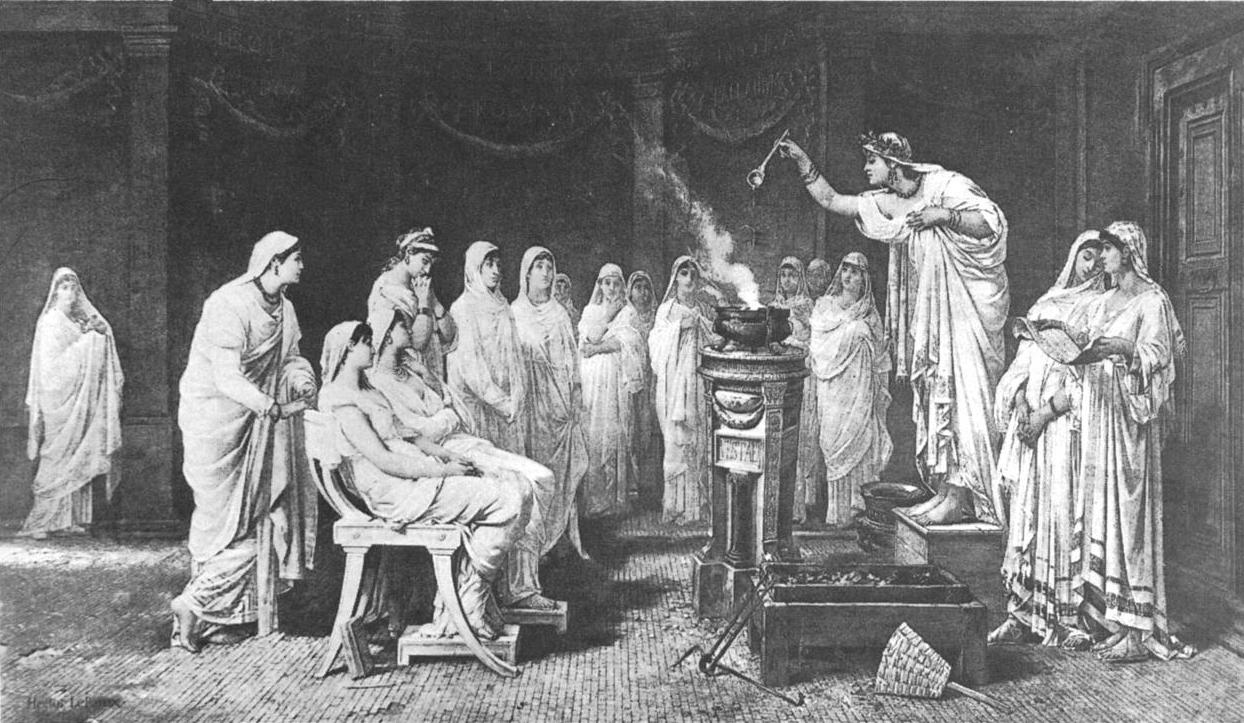
École de Vestales (1880), Mansell Collection, London

== Other themes ==
Besides Vestals, Leroux painted a number of other images inspired by the ancient world, almost invariably centered on women, including paintings of Sappho, Messalina, the Lesbia of Catullus, the mythical Danaïdes, a Sibyl, and women at worship at sacred shrines, usually in groups, but in one case a lone supplicant seeking vengeance on a faithless lover or a rival by making sacrifice to Eros Ultor (Avenging Eros).

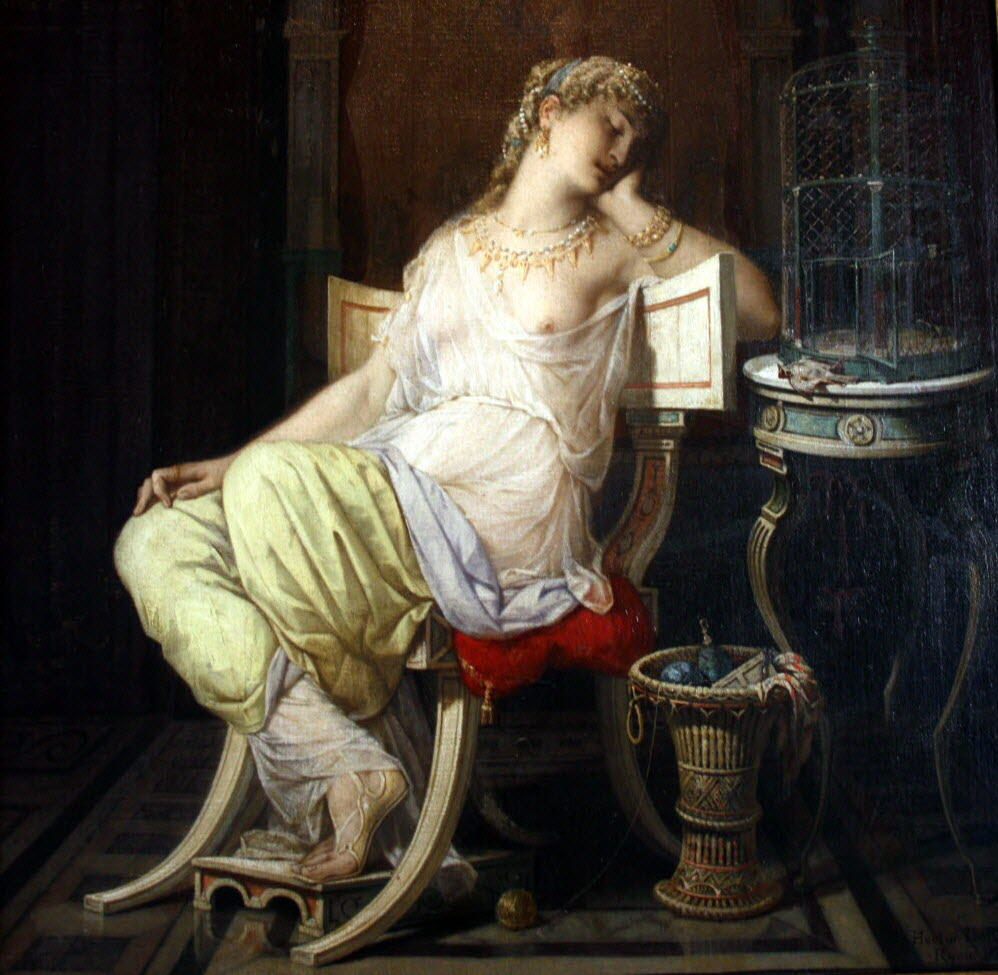
Lesbie pleurant son moineau (1868), Musée de la Princerie, Verdun

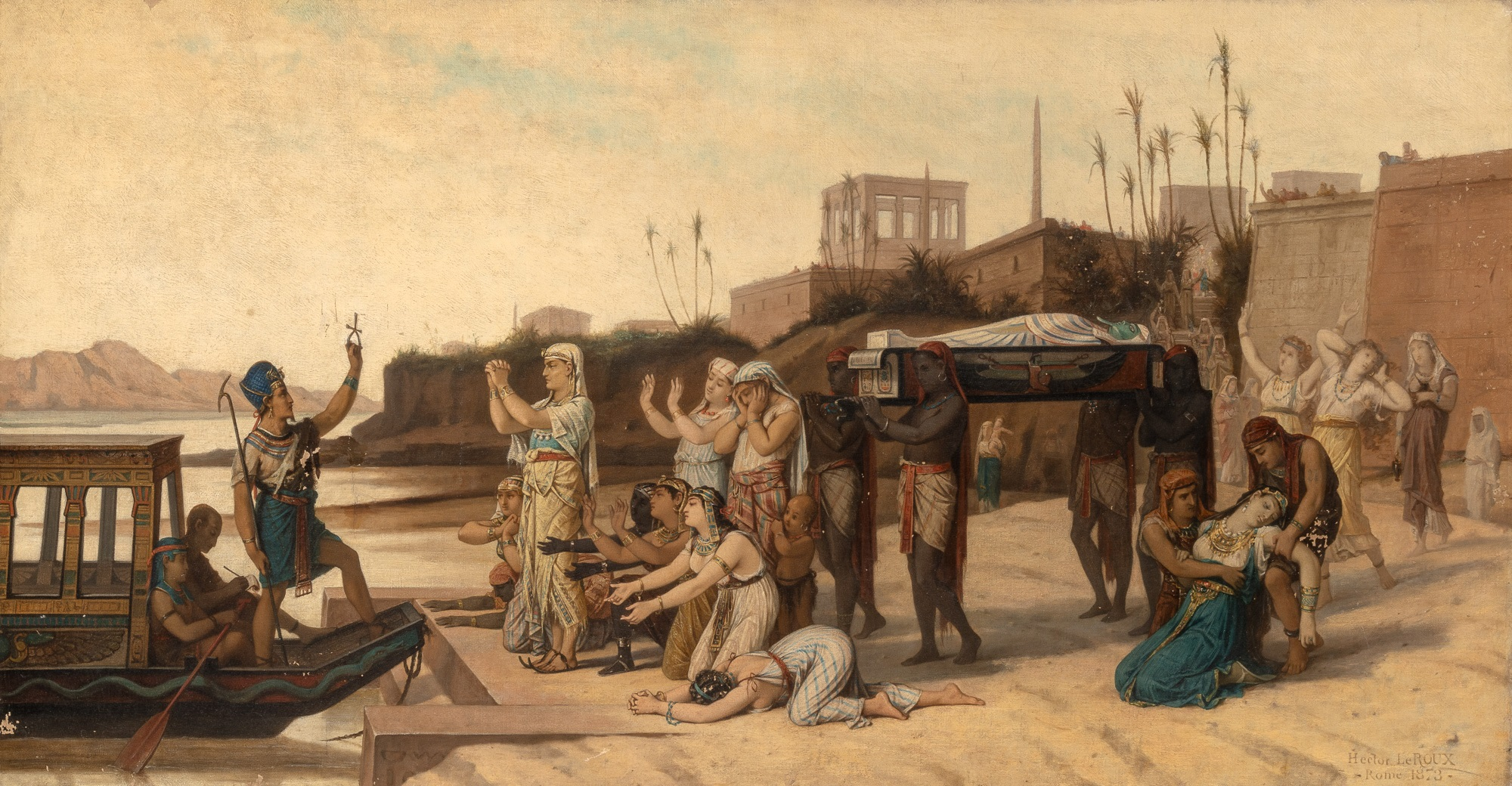
Ancient Egyptian funeral (1873), private collection

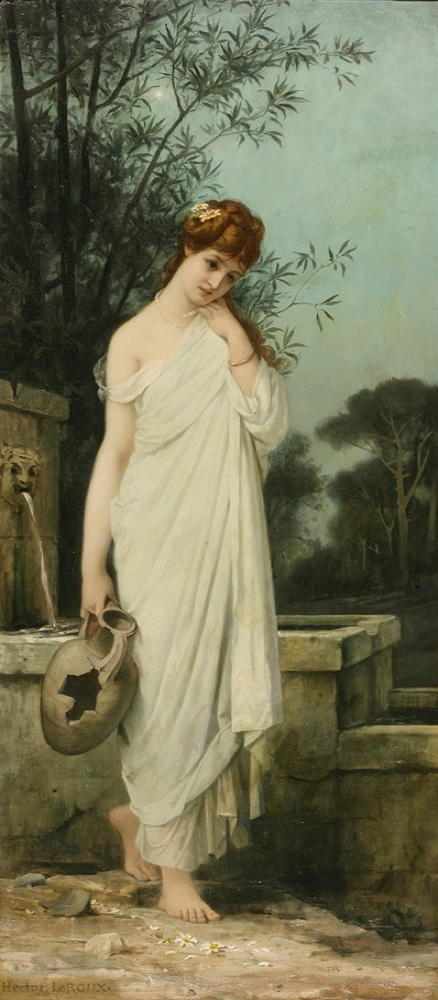
La Cruche Cassée (1877), private collection

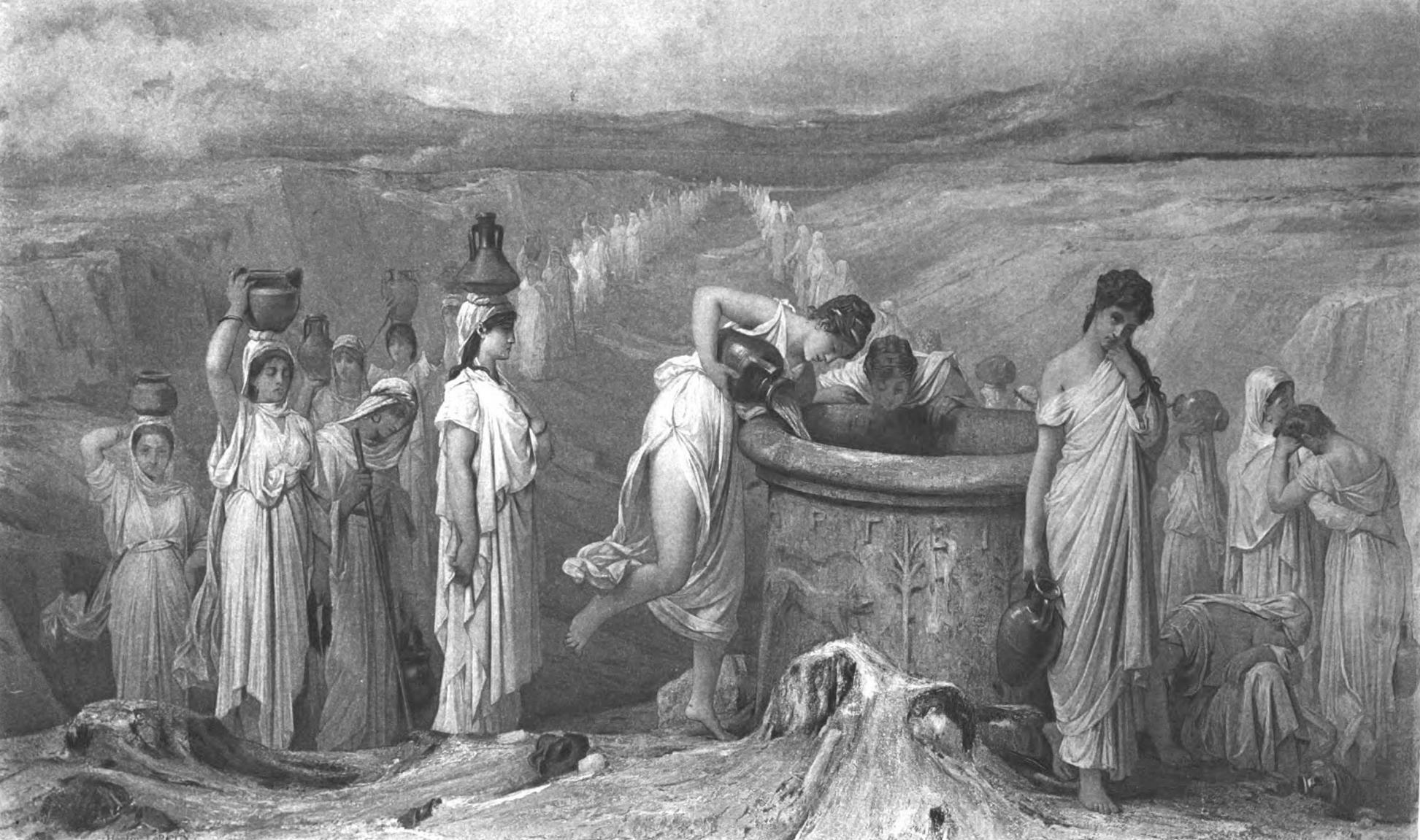
Les Danaïdes (1877), location unknown

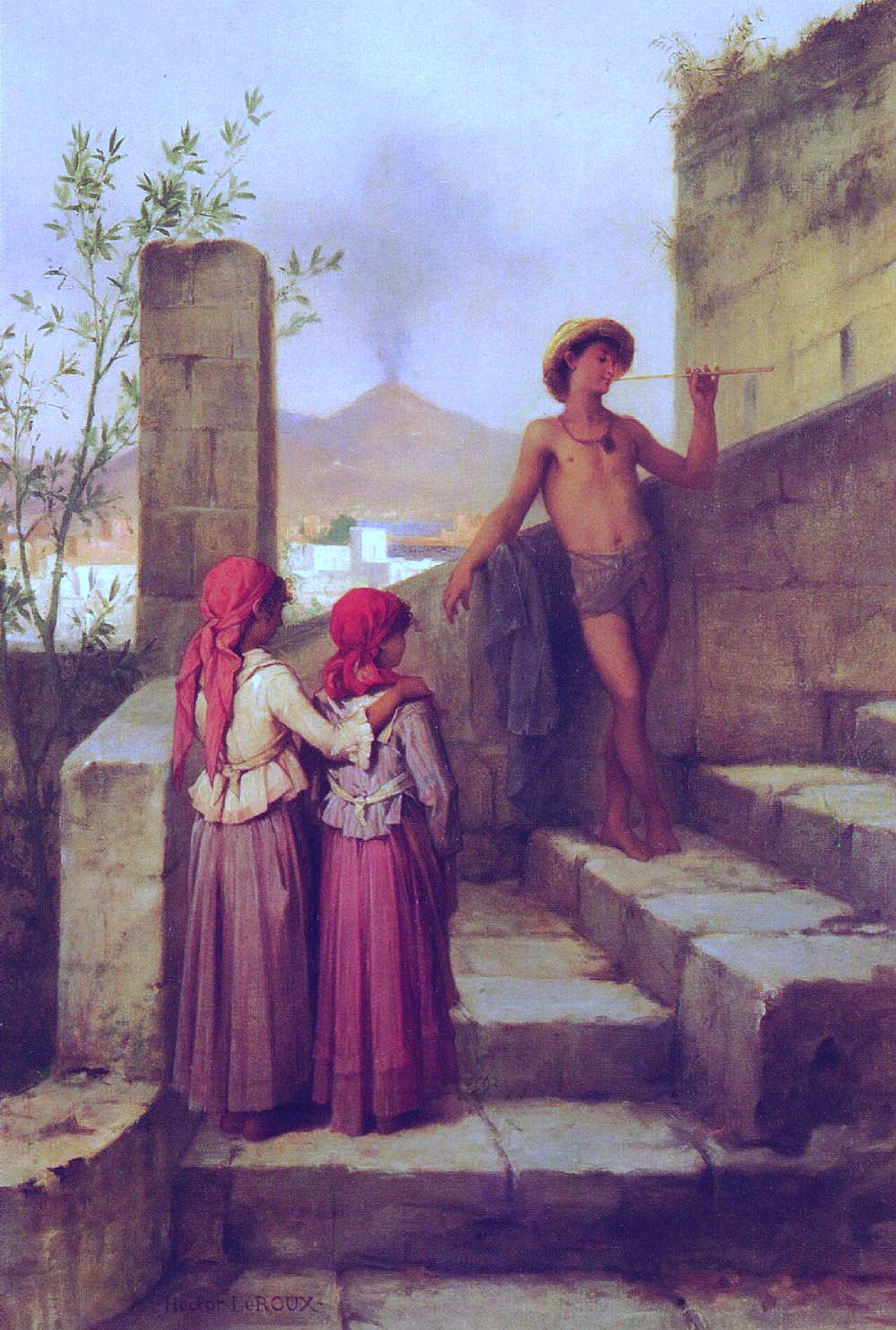
Au tombeau de Virgile; Naples (1887), private collection

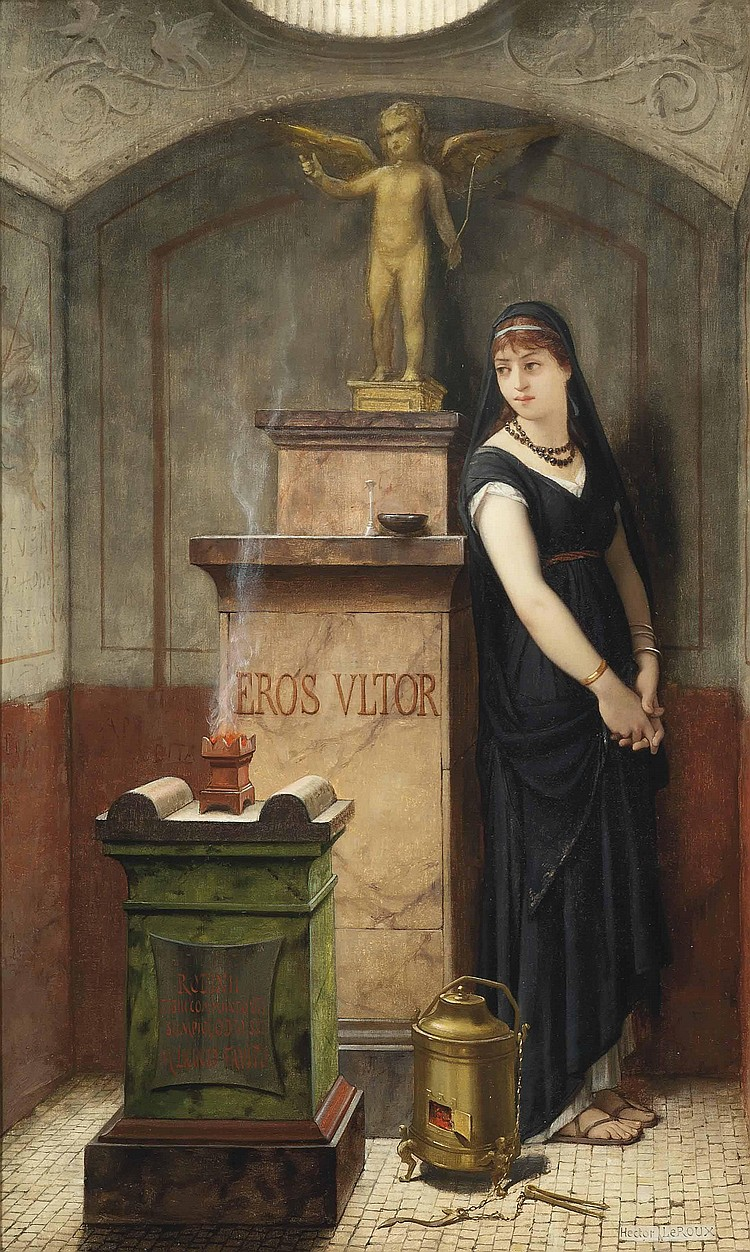
A l'Amour vengeur. Herculanum (1879), private collection

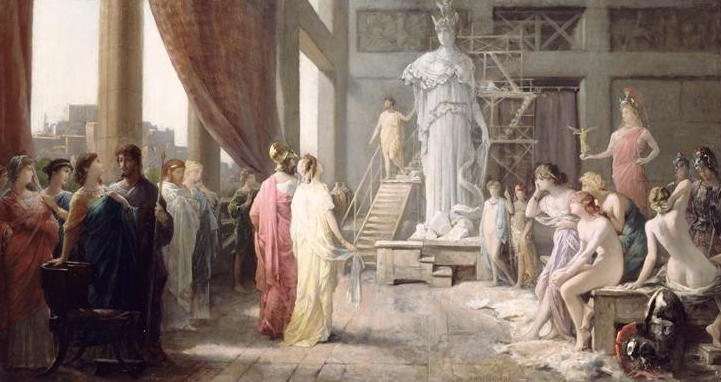
Périclès visitant l'atelier de Phidias (1898), Musée Bonnat-Helleu, Bayonne

== Historical accuracy, scholarship ==
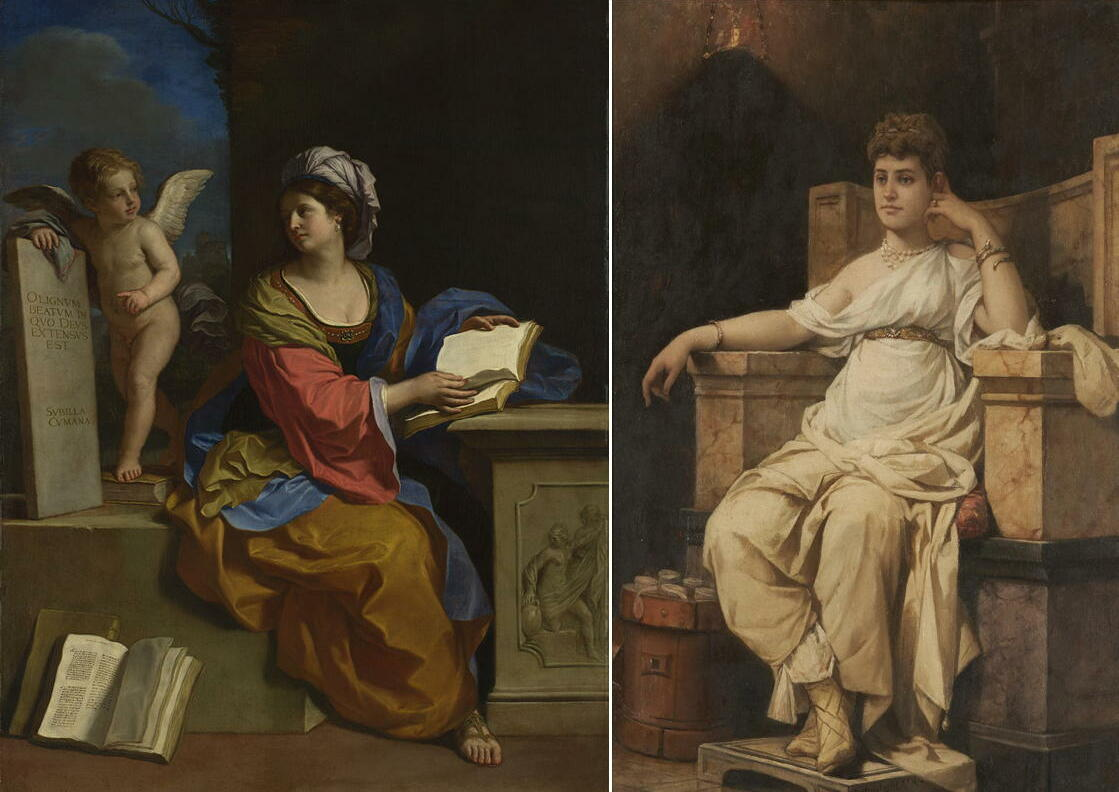
Guercino, The Cumaean Sibyl with a Putto (1651), National Gallery, London; Leroux, La Sibylle de Cumes (undated; by 1900), private collection

In his lifetime, Leroux was highly respected by colleagues and praised by critics, including Théophile Gautier, who coined the term Néo-Grecs, and his work was sought after by collectors including Americans John Jacob Astor III and Samuel P. Avery. His deep research and historical accuracy were often cited. Wrote an American critic,

Hector Leroux's works always impress the spectator with the idea that the soul of an antique Greek or Roman has somehow strayed downward through the centuries, and become incarnate in the person of a Frenchman of the nineteenth century. He paints the scenes and personages of classical antiquity as though he had dwelt among them.

While living in Italy, he followed the work of pioneering archaeologists and collaborated with them; Pietro Rosa, excavating the House of Livia on the Palatine Hill in 1869, commissioned Leroux to make watercolor copies of the ancient wall paintings "before they faded." For the library of the École des beaux-arts de Paris he was commissioned to produce a meticulous study of antique costume embellished with numerous sketches, a work which survives in manuscript form.

His painting of a Sibyl, one of the legendary oracles of the ancient world, carried on the tradition of painters including Michelangelo and Guercino, but with authentic ancient furnishing and costume; instead of an anachronistic codex, the Sibyl's prophetic books are scrolls contained in a cylindrical Roman capsa.

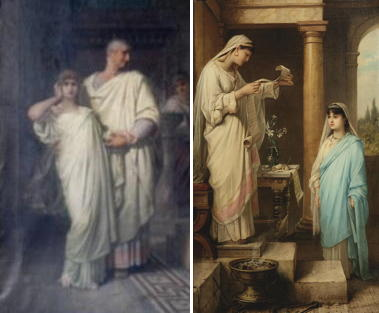
Une nouvelle vestal (detail), 1863, Musée de la Princerie, Verdun; Inauguration of a Vestal Virgin, (undated; by 1900), private collection

Leroux's accuracy was not always flawless. Vestals were recruited among girls no older than ten, but Leroux's Une Nouvelle Vestale of 1863 shows a considerably older girl being presented by the Pontifex Maximus to the Virgo Maxima. "I will not examine whether this composition is exactly consistent with historical data," wrote Marius Chaumelin in his review of the Paris Salon of 1863; "I will only point out that the novice seems to have far exceeded the upper age limit (10 years), below which the new priestesses of Vesta were chosen from the patrician families." A later painting by Leroux, depicting the inauguration of a Vestal, shows an aspirant of more suitable age.

Vestals who broke their vow of chastity were entombed alive. For the lesser offense of allowing the sacred flame of Vesta to be extinguished, the punishment was to be scourged with rods, yet Leroux, perhaps misreading the sources, believed extinction of the flame was a capital offense. In Un miracle chez la bonne déesse of 1869, he depicts a Vestal imploring a statue of the Bona Dea; describing the painting in a letter to Henner, Leroux wrote, "A young Vestal let her fire be extinguished! This is a serious matter. The whole body of Vestals has gathered and the culprit has just been sentenced to death." In a letter to an American collector, he wrote, "You do not know how terrible was the law ruling this company of virgins. They must constantly tend the sacred fire; if extinguished, it was death." Leroux produced multiple images of a negligent Vestal asleep, the dying flame beside her foreshadowing her doom.

== Interpretations ==
The French scholar Colombe Couëlle, who has written extensively on Leroux, notes his austere aesthetic sensibility, which set him apart from the more colorful Néo-Grecs such as Jean-Léon Gérôme or the "more powerful but much less refined" Gustave Boulanger:

The ancient world of Leroux is not very luminous in its colors. Sanctuaries with darkened tones, scenes of interiors drowned in darkness, twilight landscapes. The Mediterranean sky hardly enters the painter's canvases. He focuses his work on the attitudes, the gestures of the women who run through his compositions. He enters into intimacy with them through a sieving of light, as if he had an indispensable filter between their time and his own, to better grasp the essence of their existence.

In a similar vein, an American contemporary of the artist, Lucy H. Hooper, described Leroux's paintings as "dream-children; they come from the past; they are born of the mythical atmosphere that envelopes the regions of antiquity. It is for this reason that his works never show at their best in the Salon. Surrounded by the glow and glare of droning or inexperienced colourists, half of their aërial charm is lost."

The English critic Philip Gilbert Hamerton wrote in 1892: "Of all contemporary French painters, the one who is most in harmony with antiquity itself, and who most constantly dwells upon it, is M. Hector Leroux...Leroux has not that strong realism which gives such a peculiar interest to the restoration of antique life by Mr. Alma-Tadema, his art is more a poetical souvenir of a vanished past than an actual realisation of it."

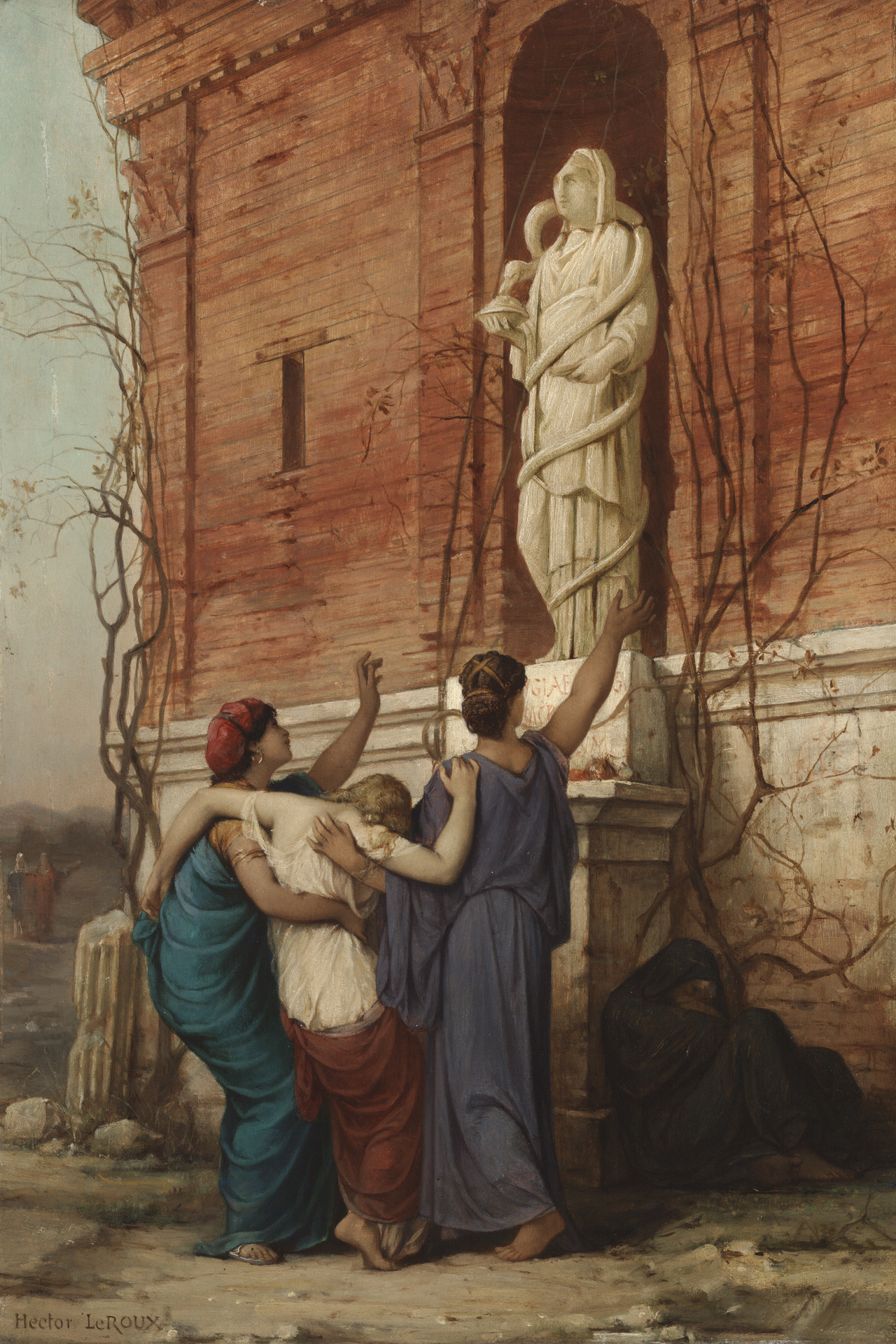
Croyantes (1862), Yale University Art Gallery

Couëlle sees in Leroux's work a manifestation of the 19th century's paradoxical view of paganism, torn between "admiration and condemnation." While Leroux is "attentive and respectful of these women who are graceful and serious, holders of a secret about the past," he also see in the Vestals' "condemnation to a long chastity" and in the punishments meted out to them "the victims of a cruel religion.

George Landow saw in Croyantes "a moving image of pagans at prayer before an idol," wherein Leroux "simultaneously dignified pagan belief and removed the privileged position Christianity presumably held in the mind of the spectator." About the same painting, Théophile Gautier asked, "Will the miracle happen?" and answered in the affirmative: "Hygieia will not let this charming patient so full of faith die, and will save her for the honor of polytheism."

Leroux himself expressed an equivalency between Christian and pagan miracles in explaining how he came to paint two different versions of the miraculous arrival of the statue of the goddess Athena atop the acropolis of Athens. The final version of Minerve Poliade sur l'Acropole d'Athènes, shown at the Paris Salon of 1878, depicts the statue appearing amid clouds of vapor, and, writes Hooper,

three young girls, the sole witnesses of the miracle. One stands in wild amazement with uplifted arms, another hides her face in terror, a third crouches on the ground. As originally designed, the canvas was crowded with figures in various attitudes of adoration or of dismay. "But," said M. Leroux, "on mature consideration, it seemed to me best that this ancient miracle, like more modern ones, should have but few witnesses, therefore I laid my first canvas aside and reproduced the whole scene anew."

In as literal a fashion as Leroux depicted the raising of Lazarus in 1857, so too he depicted the miracle stories of Tuccia and Claudia Quinta, Vestals accused of being unchaste; each proved her innocence by a supernatural act, one carrying water in sieve, the other pulling a ship up the Tiber.

Louis-Michel Gohel sees in Leroux's Vestals "an image of la femme mortifère that prefigures those of Symbolist painting. There is more than one link between the nuns of John Everett Millais digging the graves of The Vale of Rest or the white shadow embarking on Arnold Böcklin's Isle of the Dead and the Vestals of Leroux.

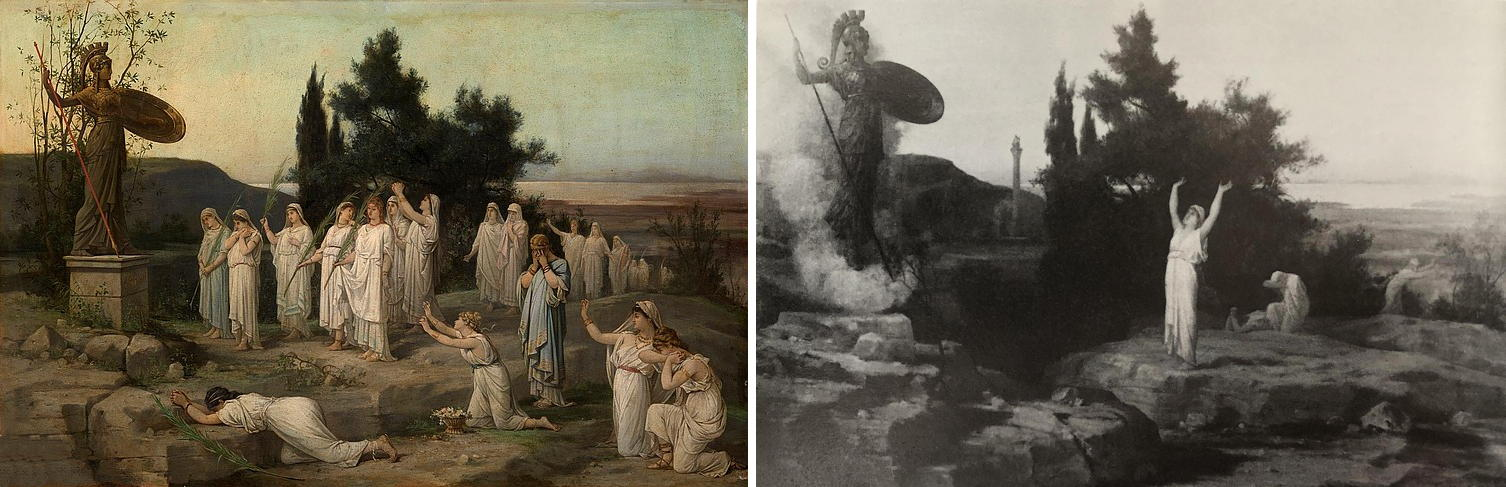
Two versions of Minerve Poliade sur l'Acropole d'Athènes: left, the first version (private collection), and right, the second and final version shown at the Paris Salon of 1878, now at the Musée Boucher-de-Perthes, Abbeville

== Personal life ==
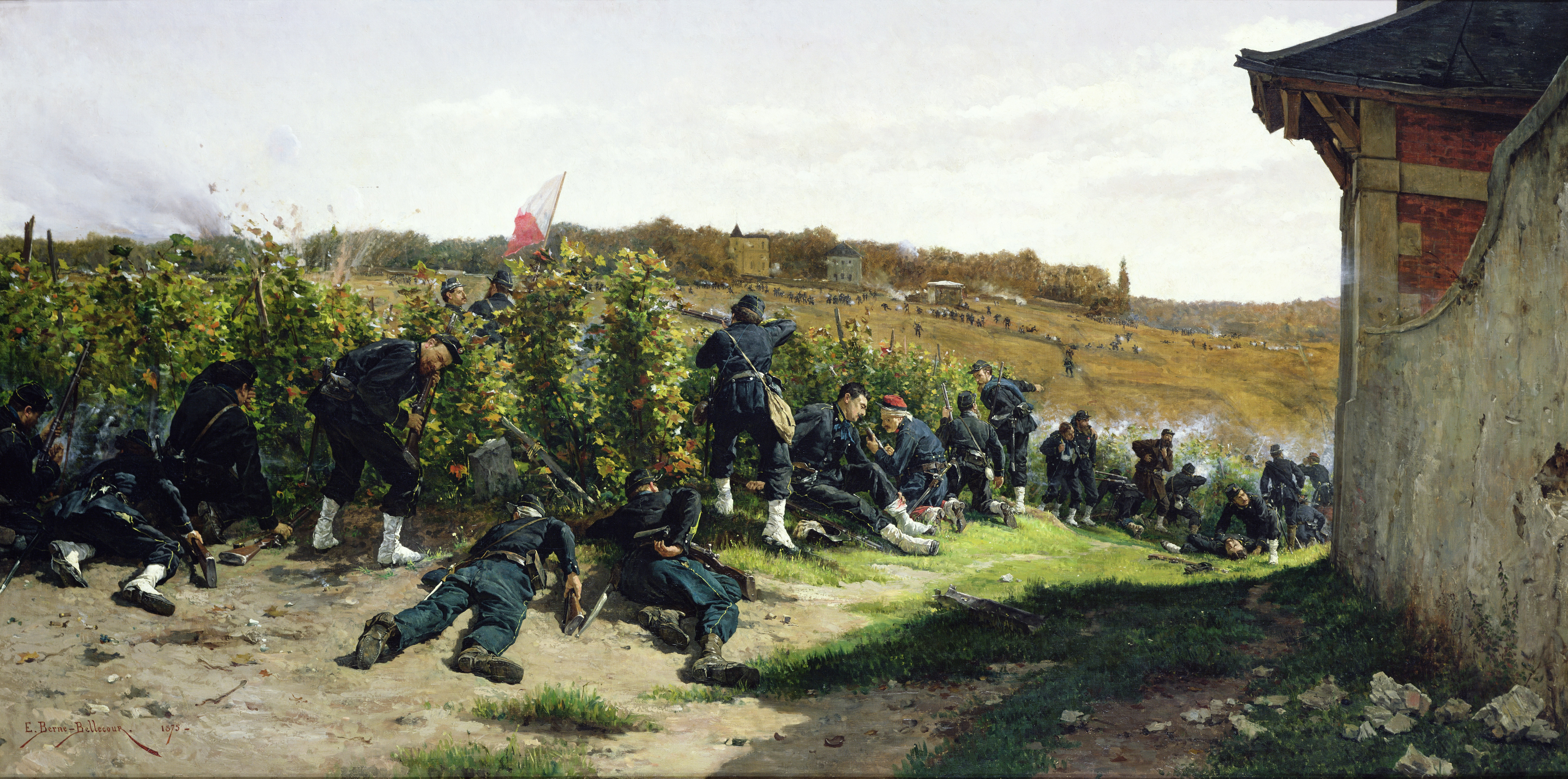
Berne-Bellecour, Les Tirailleurs de la Seine au combat de Rueil-Malmaison (1875), depicting the engagement in which Leroux was wounded

In 1870, Leroux, residing in Rome, happened to be back in France on a visit when the Franco-Prussian War broke out. He served in the Francs-tireurs de la Seine alongside fellow artists Étienne-Prosper Berne-Bellecour, Gustave Jacquet, Alexandre-Louis Leloir, Jehan Georges Vibert, Jules Ferdinand Jacquemart, and the sculptor Joseph Cuvelier. "They fought bravely at Malmaison" in the Battle of Buzenval, where "Leroux had his leg broken by a projectile." Berne-Bellecour depicted the engagement in a painting made five years later.

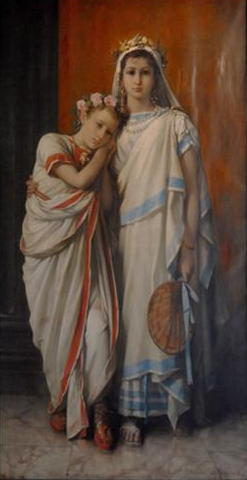
The artist's children in ancient Roman costume: Frère et Soeur (1888)

Leroux married Giuditta Clelia Casali, the daughter of his Italian doctor, on November 25, 1871. Their daughter, Maria Laura Desiderata Le Roux, was born September 14, 1872, in Dun-sur-Meuse, near Verdun, in France. She became a painter, studying under her father and then under his friends Lefebre and Henner, debuting at the Paris Salon of 1892. In 1898 she married Louis Revault (1866–1950), a French chocolate manufacturer and later a politician.

A son, Nicolà (or Nicolas), was born c. 1874.

A profile of the artist in Gil Blas published on his birthday in 1886 describes his home and atelier at 26 Rue Lemercier:

The workshop is on the second floor. One climbs a staircase whose steps are covered with Aubusson carpets; earthenware from Delft, Saxony, Rouen, drawings by all modern masters, among whom we notice wonderful sketches by Detaille and Henner, adorn the walls; lamps from Judea and Palestine, hanging from long chains and burning a fragrant oil, throw a strange light onto the stairs, where, thanks to the thickness of the carpets, not a step is heard. Let's enter the workshop....On the grayish walls you can see drawings and paintings executed according to the decorations, frescoes and sculptures that adorn the houses of Pompeii, ornamental studies, bronze and marble statuettes. The weapons and armor used by the gladiators are placed on shelves.

The same article says that Leroux, at age fifty-two,

does not seem his age, and is above average in size, thin, slender; the eye perfectly framed under a thick eyebrow is both incisive and gentle, and one understands at first glance that this man is good and loyal. His critiques, formulated with extreme sincerity, often in an acerbic tone, are always sound and logical...His life is very simple. Morning is devoted to work; the afternoons of Tuesday, Thursday and Saturday are devoted to his students; young girls of the best circles come to work in his atelier...Hector Leroux is married; he has two children, a twelve-year-old boy and a lovely fourteen-year-old girl. With few exceptions, his evenings are spent with the family.

Clelia LeRoux died in 1892, at the age of thirty-nine. Hector Leroux died at his son's home in Angers in 1900 at the age of seventy. He was buried in the cemetery of Dun-sur-Meuse.

=== Henner's paintings of the Leroux family ===
Over three decades, Jean-Jacques Henner painted several portraits of Hector Leroux and his family, beginning with a portrait of Leroux in profile wearing a red cap, painted in 1861 when both artists were residing at the Villa Medici in Rome. Henner's full-length portrait of Laura Leroux now at the Musée d'Orsay was shown at the Paris Salon of 1898 and purchased by the French State.

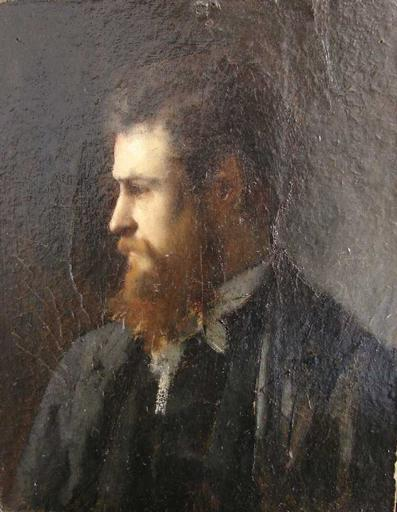
Hector Leroux, c. 1870, Musée Jean-Jacques Henner, Paris

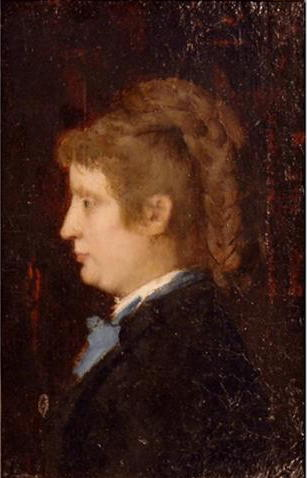
Clelia Leroux, by 1892, Musée de la Princerie, Verdun

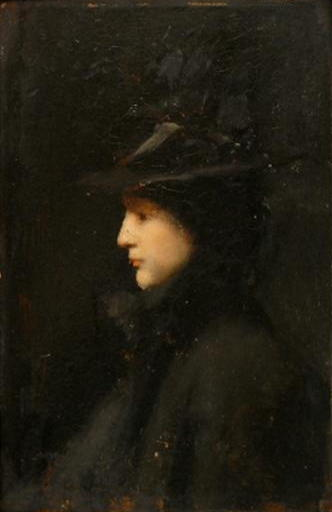
Laura Leroux, c. 1898, Musée de la Princerie, Verdun

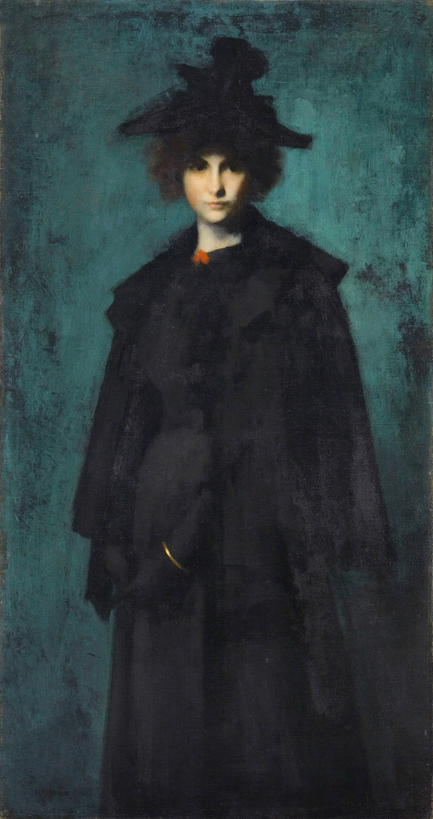
Laura Leroux, 1898, Musée d'Orsay, Paris

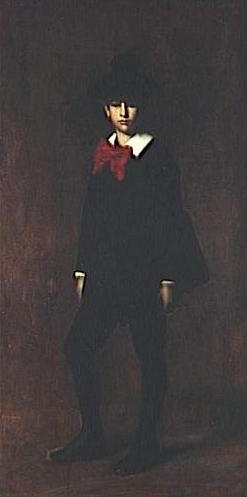
Nicolas Leroux, 1884, Musée Jean-Jacques Henner, Paris

== In museums ==
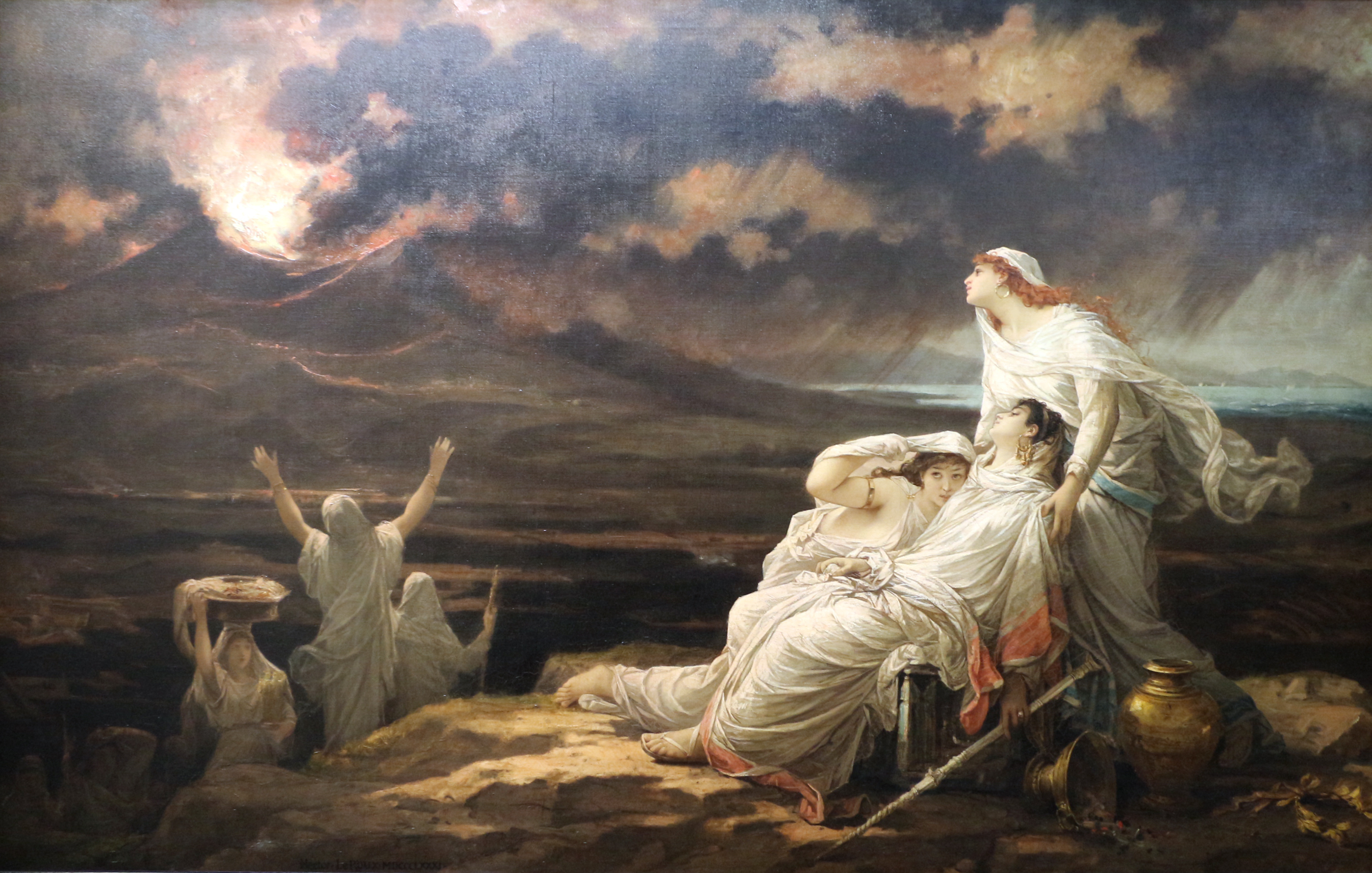
Herculanum, 23 août, an 79 (1881), Musée d'Orsay

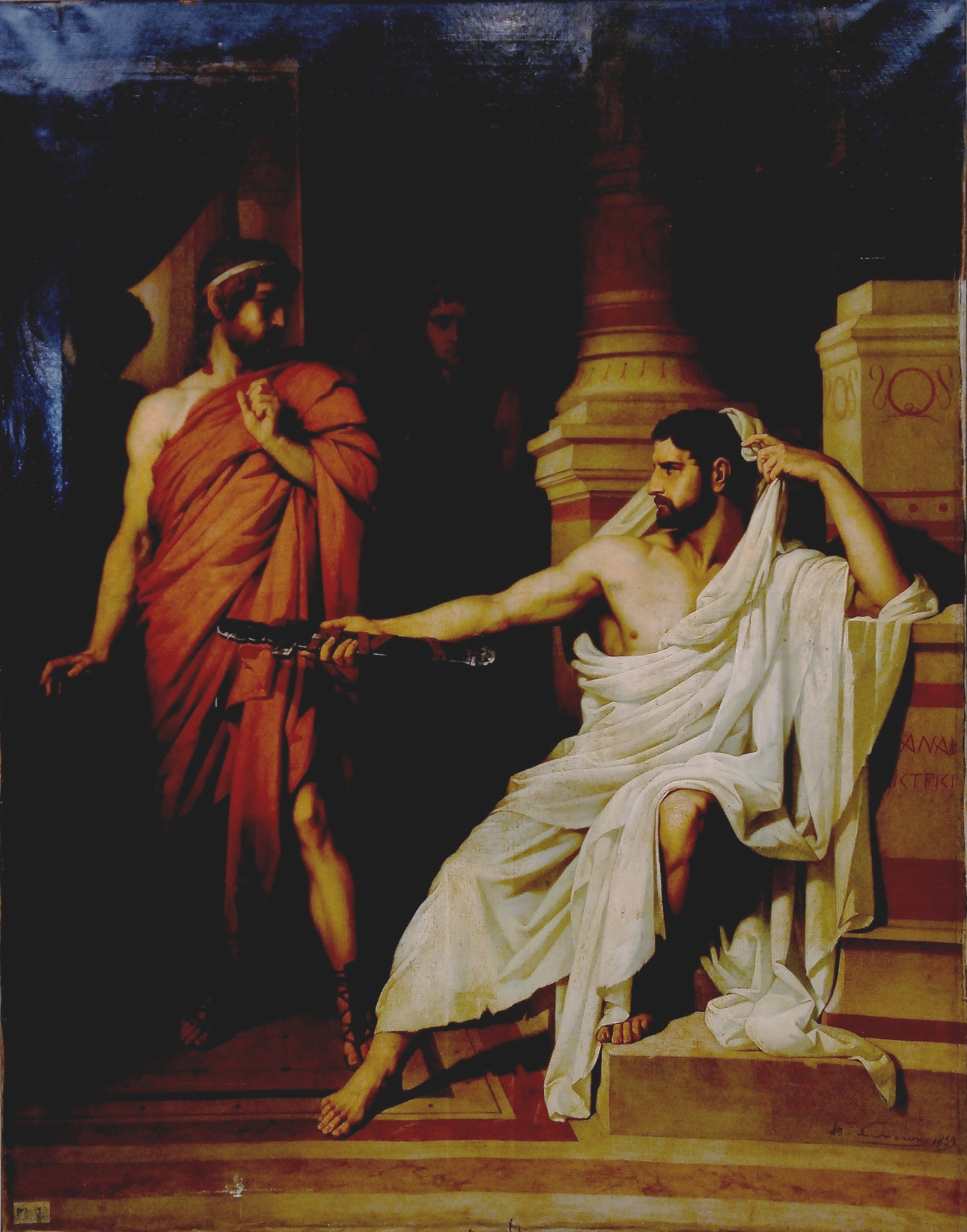
Coriolan chez les Volsques, (1859), Musée de la Princerie

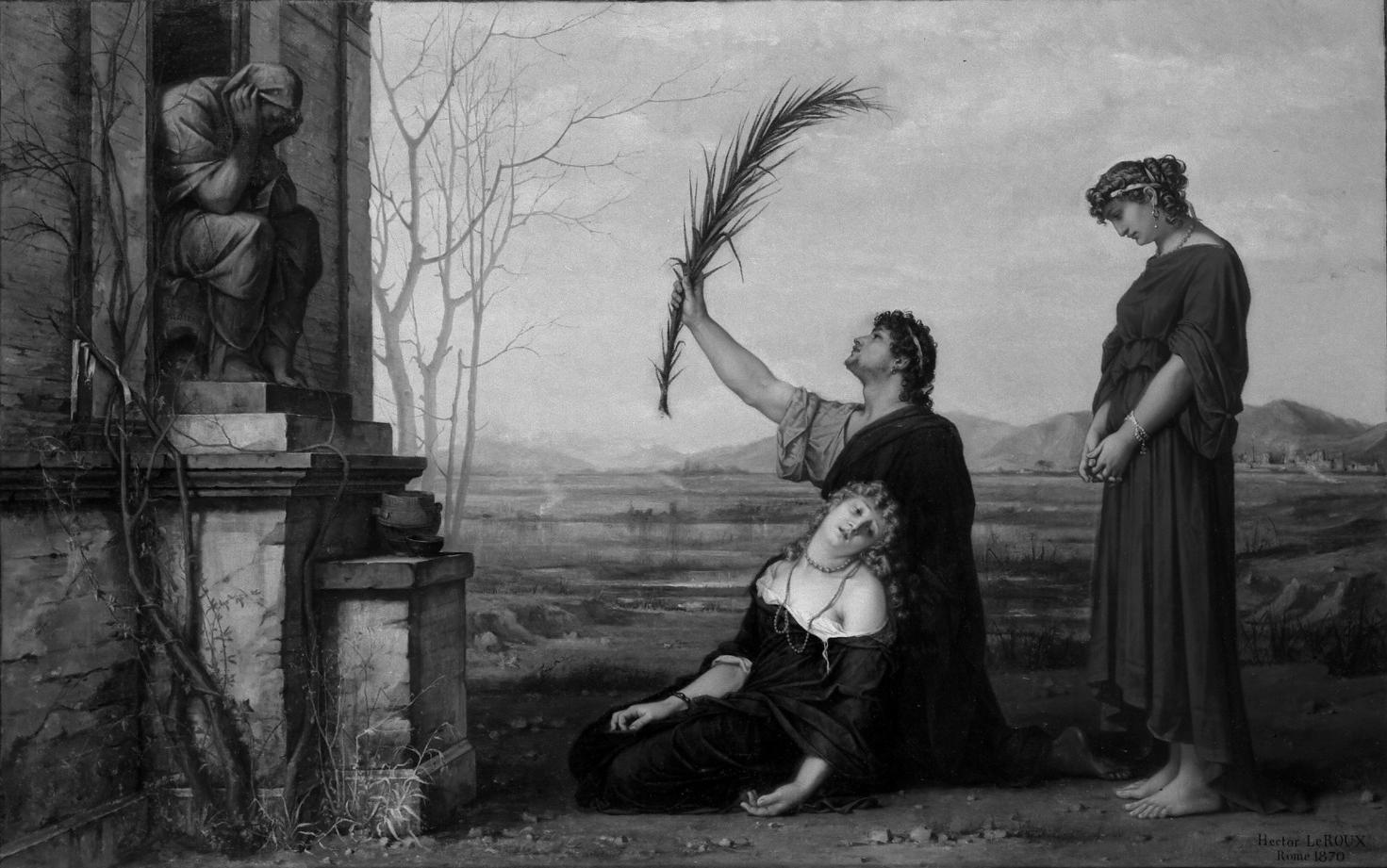
Prière à la fièvre (1870), Brooklyn Museum

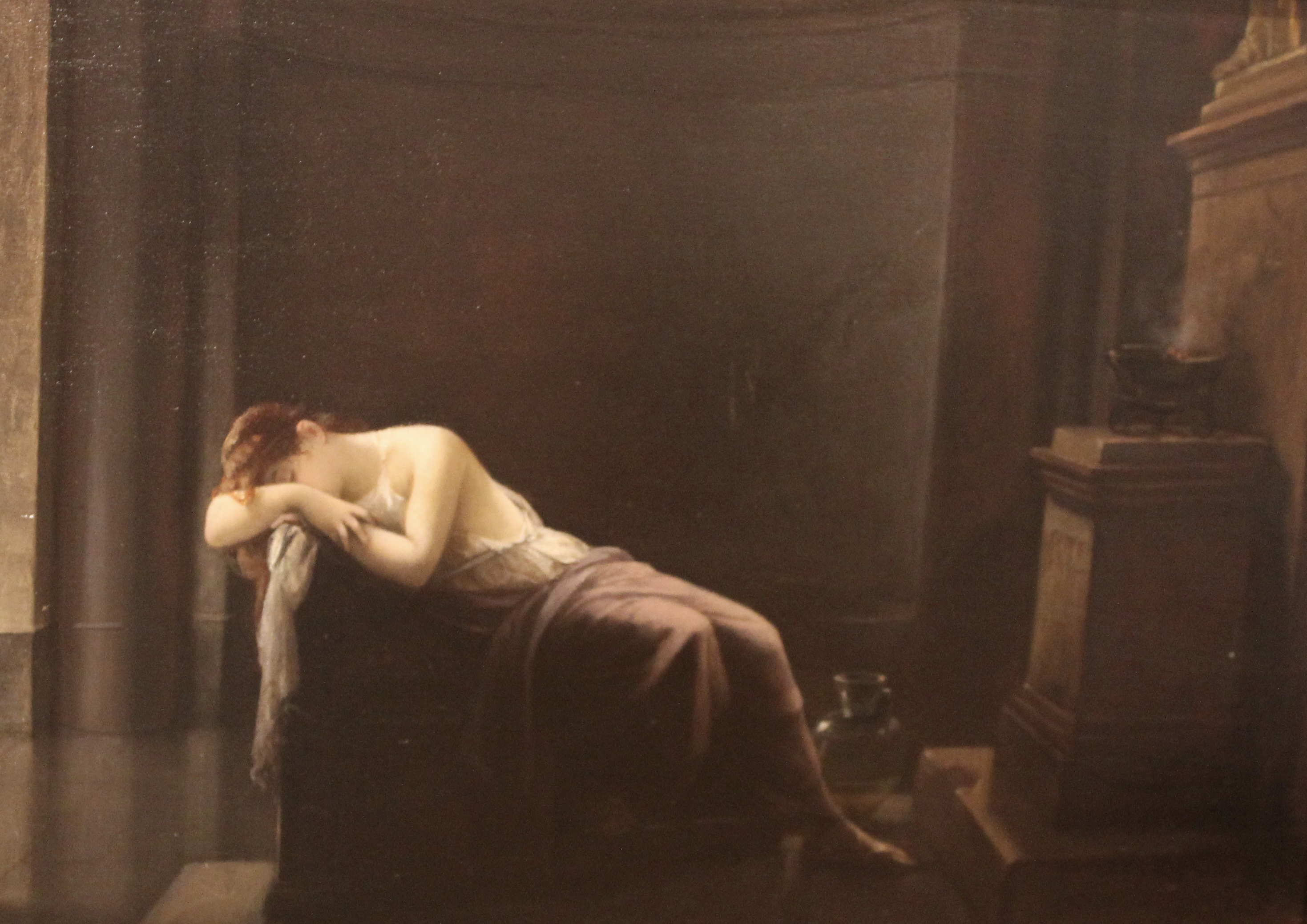
Une gardienne du feu sacre de Vesta (undated), Widener University Art Museum

=== Verdun ===
The largest collection of Leroux's work has been amassed at the Musée de la Princerie in his hometown of Verdun. Paintings include his earliest known work, Jésus guérissant un paralytique (1850); Coriolan chez les Volsques, submitted for the Prix de Rome in 1859; Une nouvelle Vestale and Croyantes or Invocation à la déesse Hygie, his debut pieces at the Paris Salon of 1863; Lesbie pleurant son moineau (1868); Frère et soeur, depicting the artist's children, Nicolas and Laura, in ancient Roman costume, shown at the Exposition Universelle of 1889 in Paris; and Trois lectrices (1891). The museum also holds numerous studies and sketches valuable for their information about finished paintings which can no longer be located.

=== Paris ===
The Musée d'Orsay holds three paintings, La Résurrection de Lazare, Leroux's second-place entry to the Prix de Rome in 1857; Funérailles au Columbarium de la maison des Césars, porte Capène à Rome (1864) and Herculanum, 23 août, an 79 (1881).

In 1889 Leroux painted three panels on Classical themes for the plafond of the Salles des Pastels in the Louvre, Vénus visitant Glycère, accompagnée de l'Amour, les Grâces et le cortège de la Jeunesse; Union de la poésie grecque et latine; and Junon au bain.

The École Nationale Supérieure des Beaux-Arts de Paris holds Philoclès dans l'île de Samos (1855) and Homère demandant l'hospitalité (1855), two studies painted while Leroux was a student; a number of student drawings made in the 1850s; and two commissioned copies, L'amour sacré, L'amour profane (1860, after Titian) and L'Aurore (c. 1864, after Guido Reni).

The panel painting L'Eloquence (1888) is in the Salon des Lettres of the Hôtel de Ville. The Musée des beaux-arts de la ville de Paris in the Petit Palais holds a study for this work.

The Grande Chancellerie de la Légion d'Honneur holds Nouvelles du dehors (1891).

The Centre national des arts plastiques (CNAP) holds Une vue sur Athènes (undated).

=== Elsewhere in France ===
- Adam et Ève retrouvant le corps d'Abel (1858), Musée Comtadin-Duplessis, Carpentras.
- Sérénade (c. 1867), Mairie de Saint-Germain-en-Laye.
- A Scene from the Youth of Blaise Pascal (1869), Musée Thomas-Henry, Cherbourg.
- Minerve Poliade sur l'Acropole d'Athènes (1878), Musée Boucher-de-Perthes, Abbeville.
- La Vestale Licinia laissant éteindre le feu sacré (c. 1880), Musée Fesch, Ajaccio.
- Le Collège des Vestales quittant Rome en l'an 390 (1884), Musée Antoine-Lécuyer, Saint-Quentin, Aisne.
- La pierre mystérieuse de Pompei (1885), Musée des Beaux-Arts, Dunkirk.
- Lanuzia, vestale or Suicide de la vestale (1895), Musée barrois, Bar-le-Duc.
- Périclès visitant l'atelier de Phidias (1898), Musée Bonnat-Helleu, Bayonne.

=== United States ===
- Croyantes or Invocation to the Goddess Hygieia (1862), Yale University Art Gallery, New Haven, Connecticut.
- Prière à la fièvre (1870), Brooklyn Museum, New York City.
- Vestal Maiden Asleep in a Chair, drawing inscribed to Samuel Putnam Avery (1879), Metropolitan Museum of Art, New York City.
- Une gardienne du feu sacré de Vesta (undated), Widener University Art Museum, Alfred O. Deshong Collection, Chester, Pennsylvania.

== At auction ==
Leroux's oil on canvas painting of Vestal virgins at the Roman Colosseum (c. 1890; 78x126 cm.; from a private collection in Italy) was auctioned by Dorotheum in Vienna in May 2023 with a result of €24,700, a 21st-century record for the artist, until the sale of Le moineau de Lesbie (The Sparrow of Lesbia) for €35,976 at Artcurial in Paris in November 2025.

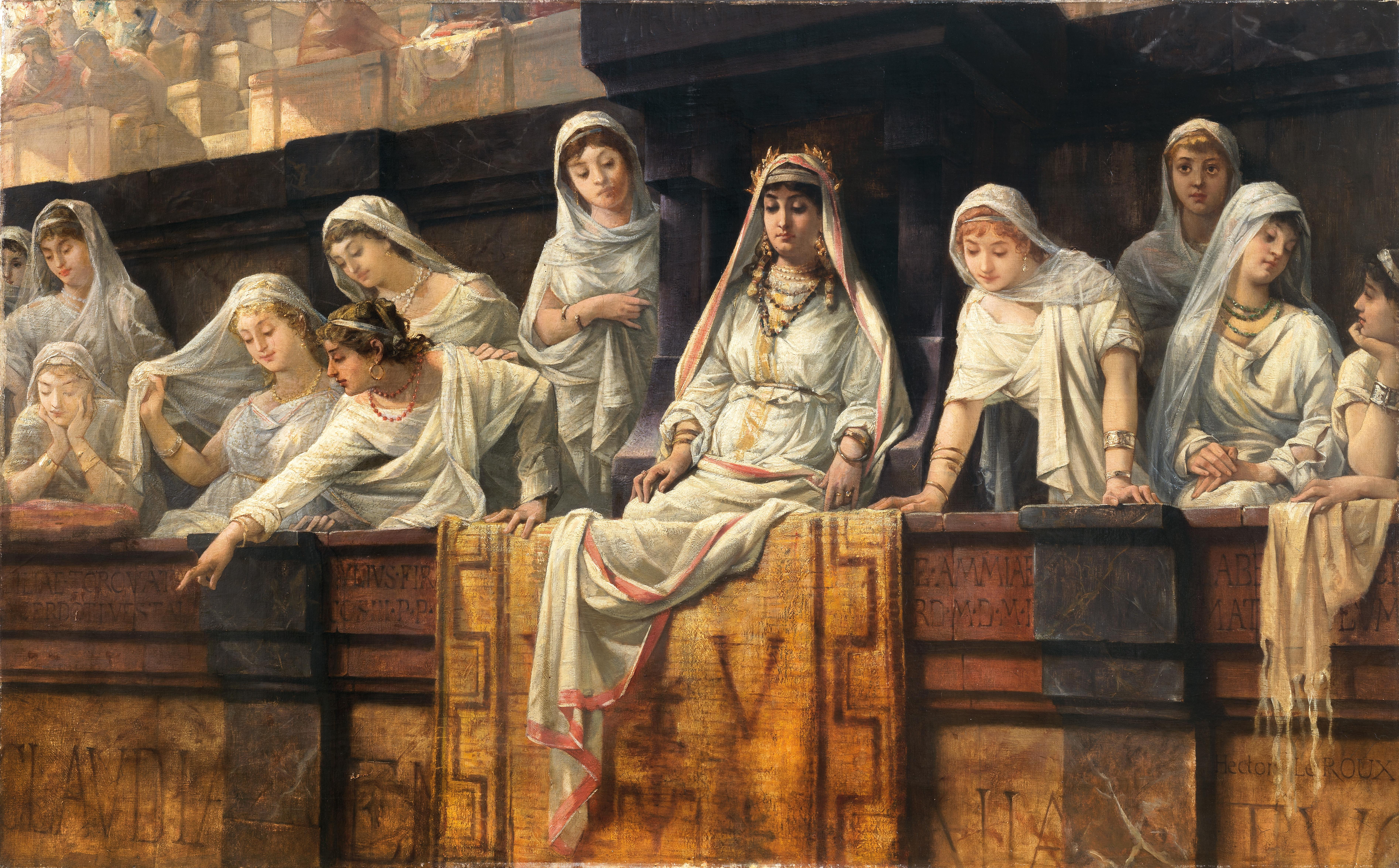
Leroux's painting of Vestal virgins at the Roman Colosseum (c. 1890)

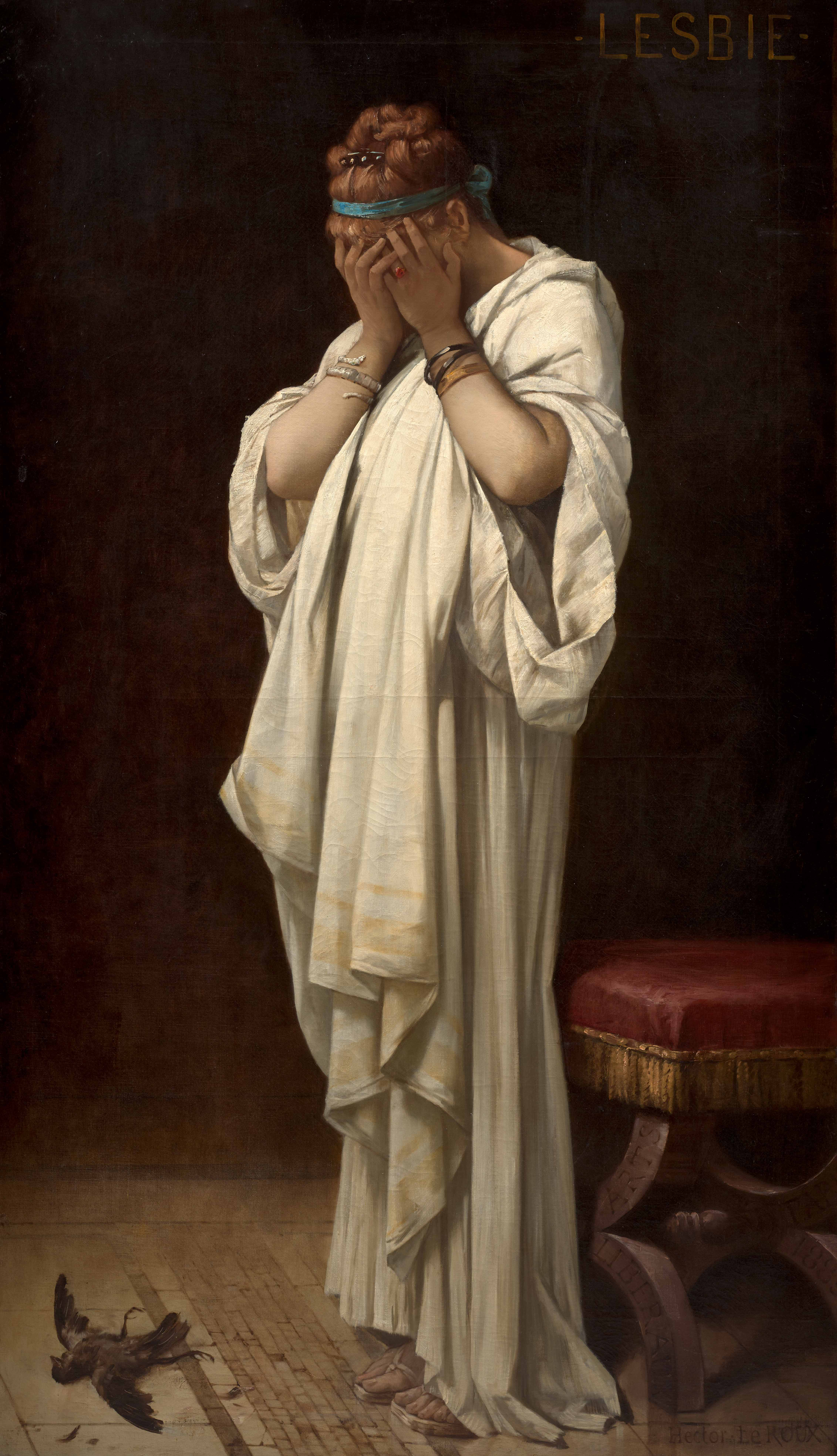
Le moineau de Lesbie (1883)

== Sources ==
- Bénézit, E. "Leroux (Louis-Hector)", "Dictionnaire des peintres, sculpteurs, dessinateurs et graveurs", vol III: L-Z, Paris: Librarie Gründ, 1939, pp. 106–107.
- Bournand, François. Catalogue illustré de l'Exposition internationale de blanc & noir au Palais du Louvre ("Hector Leroux," pp. 16–17), Paris: E. Bernard, 1885.
- Child, Theodore. "The Paris Salon", The Decorator and Furnisher, Vol. 4, No. 3, June 1884, pp. 87–89.
- Cook, Clarence. Art and Artists of our Time, New York: Selmar Hess, 1888, vol. I, pp. 22-23.
- Couëlle, Colombe (2008). "Hector Leroux (1829-1900). Un peintre du XIXe voué à l'Antique", Journée de l'Antiquité 2008, April 2008, Université de La Réunion, Saint-Denis, La Réunion, pp. 210–245.
- Couëlle, Colombe (2009). "La pierre mystérieuse de Pompéi d'Hector Leroux. Une énigme archéologique dans le goût du XIX e siècle", Anabases, No. 10, 2009, pp. 181–201.
- Couëlle, Colombe (2010). "Désirs d'Antique ou comment rêver le passé gréco-romain dans la peinture européenne de la seconde moitié du XIX e siècle", Anabases, No. 11, 2010, pp. 21–54
- Couëlle, Colombe (2012). "Le corps antique dans tous ses atours, réinventé par la peinture européenne du XIXe siècle", Journée de l’Antiquité et des temps anciens, April 2012, Saint-Denis, La Réunion, pp. 80–98.
- Couëlle, Colombe (2013). "Invocation à la déesse Hygie d’Hector Leroux (1863). Images de la maladie dans le monde romain", Journée de l’Antiquité et des temps anciens, April 2013, Saint-Denis, La Réunion, pp. 238–259.
- Gallet Louis, Salon de 1865: peinture, sculpture, Paris: Le Bailly, 1863, p. 19.
- Gohel, Louis-Michel, et al. Louis-Hector Leroux (Verdun 1829-Angers 1900). Peintures et esquisses, Musées de Bar-le-Duc et Verdun, Imprimerie du Barrois, January, 1988.
- Hamerton, Philip Gilbert. The Present State of the Fine Arts in France, London: Seeley and Co. Ltd., 1892.
- Hooper, Lucy H. (1878). "The Foreshadowings of the Salon", The Art Journal, New Series, Vol. 4 (1878), pp. 60–61.
- Hooper, Lucy H. (1880). "The Paris Salon of 1880", The Art Journal, New Series, Vol. 6 (1880), pp. 221–222.
- Katow, Paul de. "Peintres et Sculpteurs: Hector Leroux", Gil Blas, December 27, 1886, p. 2.
- Landow, George P. "Victorianized Romans: Images of Rome in Victorian Painting", Browning Institute Studies, Vol. 12, 1984, pp. 29–51.
- Le Pape, Yannick. "L'inspiration et l'imprudence: poésie de l'anticomanie dans la critique d'art du second XIX e siècle", Anabases, No. 26, 2017, pp. 157–174.
- Mlochowski de Bélina, Apollo. Nos peintres dessinés par eux-mêmes: notes humoristiques et esquisses biographiques, Paris: E. Bernard, 1883.
- Montrosier, Eugène. Les Artistes Modernes, Première Partie: Les Peintres de Genre, Paris: H. Launette, 1881, pp. 105–8.
- Strahan, Earl (1878). Reproductions and essays on The Danaides and The Vestal Tuccia in The Chefs-d'Oeuvre d'Art of the International Exhibition, 1878, Philadelphia: G. Barrie., c. 1878.
- Strahan, Earl (1882). "Chapter III: Hector Leroux and the 'Idealists'", pp. 29–46 in Études in Modern French Art, New York: Richard Worthington, 1882.
