= Dun-sur-Meuse =

- Commune
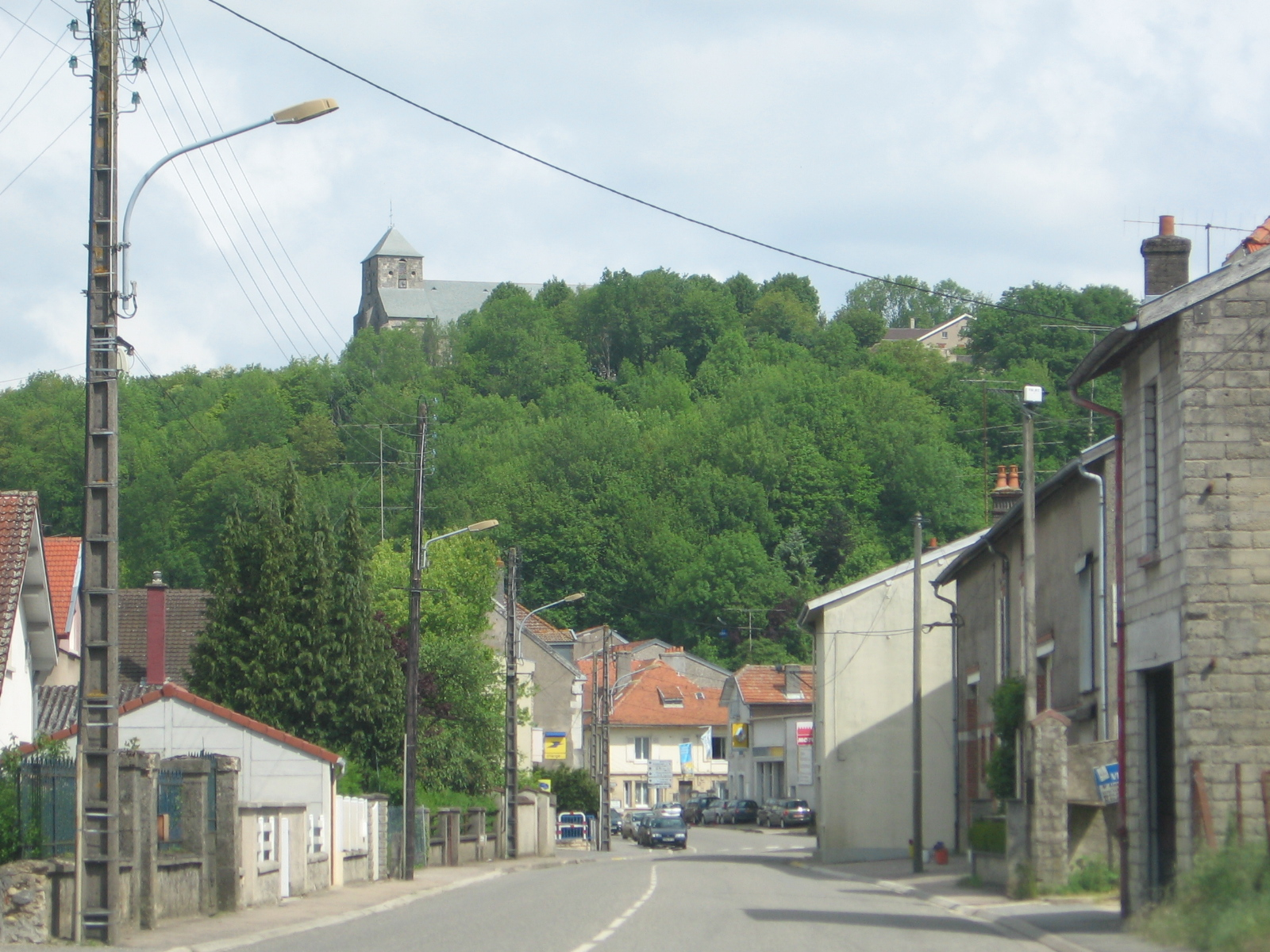
- The village of Dun-sur-Meuse

- Coat of arms
- Location of Dun-sur-Meuse
- Location within France Location within Grand Est
- Coordinates: 49°23′12″N 5°11′02″E
- Country: France
- Region: Grand Est
- Department: Meuse
- Arrondissement: Verdun
- Canton: Stenay
- Intercommunality: CC du Pays de Stenay et du Val Dunois

Government
  - Mayor (2020–2026): Pierre Ploner
- Area^{1}: 6.41 km^{2} (2.47 sq mi)
- Elevation: 175 m (574 ft)
- Highest elevation: 282 m (925 ft)
- Lowest elevation: 170 m (560 ft)
- Population (2023): 585
  - Density: 91.3/km^{2} (236/sq mi)
- Demonym: dunois
- Time zone: UTC+01:00 (CET)
  - Summer (DST): UTC+02:00 (CEST)
- INSEE/Postal code: 55167 /55110
- ^{1} French Land Register data, which excludes lakes, ponds, glaciers > 1 km^{2} (0.386 sq mi or 247 acres) and river estuaries.

Dun-sur-Meuse (French pronunciation: [dœ̃ syʁ møz], literally Dun on Meuse) is a commune in the Meuse department in Grand Est in north-eastern France.

Among notable residents was the painter Hector Leroux, who was buried in the cemetery there.

== History ==
In the 11th century, Duke Godfrey III of the House of Ardenne–Verdun built a castle on the hill, which was expanded in 1402 with a fortified surrounding wall. Henri, Duke of Bouillon, seized control of the fortress in 1592. The castle was demolished in August 1642, as were many fortified locations in Lorraine, on the order of King Louis XIII. In 1648, Anne of Austria, Louis' widow, gave control of the town to Louis, Grand Condé.

The upper town was heavily damaged in the fighting of World War I.

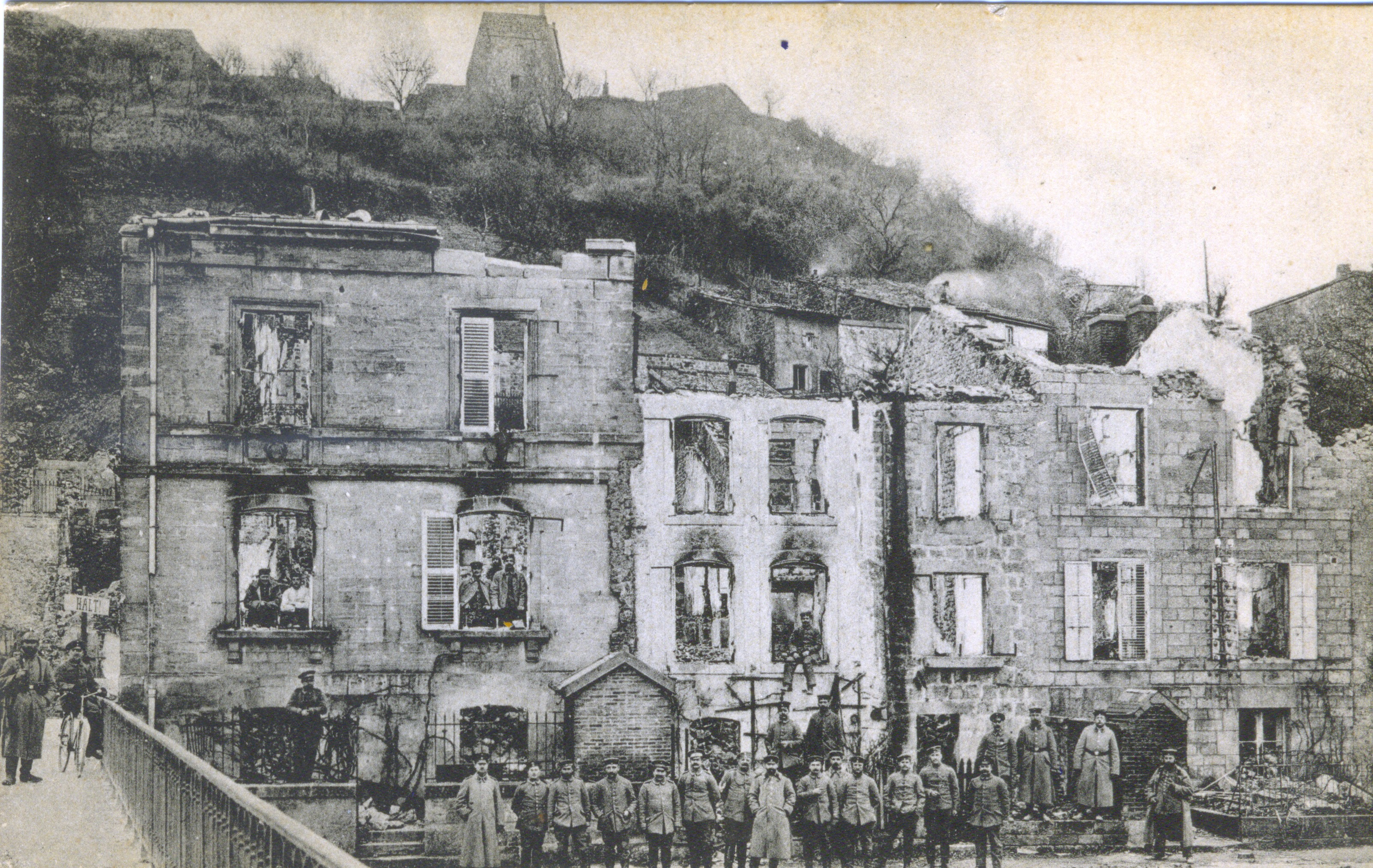
Dun-sur-Meuse during World War I

== See also ==
- Communes of the Meuse department
