= Alsace, She Waits =

Painting by Jean-Jacques Henner

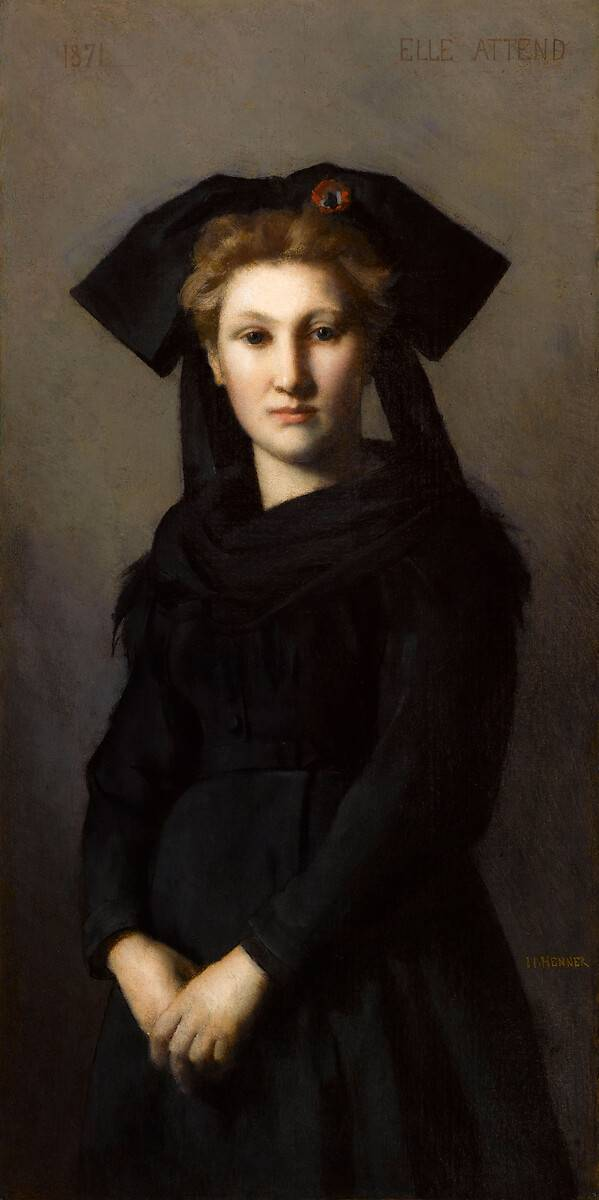
- Artist: Jean-Jacques Henner
- Year: 1871
- Medium: oil on canvas
- Dimensions: 60 cm × 30 cm (24 in × 12 in)
- Location: Musée national Jean-Jacques Henner, Paris

Alsace, She Waits (French: l’Alsace, Elle attend) is an oil on canvas painting by Jean-Jacques Henner, from 1871. It is held in the Musée national Jean-Jacques Henner, in Paris.

== Background ==
The painting was commissioned by the wives of industrialists from Thann, led by Eugénie Kestner, the daughter of General Rigaux and the widow of the chemist Charles Kestner. It was intended to lament the loss of Alsace, annexed by the newly established German Empire at the conclusion of the Franco-Prussian War. Henner, himself an Alsatian born in Bernwiller, offered to create it. He was already renowned for his portraits and had painted a portrait of his niece in Alsatian costume the previous year; moreover, he was deeply attached to the land of Alsace.

The painting was intended as a gift for Léon Gambetta, who had opposed the signing of an armistice when he was Minister of the Interior and War and who had acted, unsuccessfully, to prevent the annexation. Gambetta commissioned Léopold Flameng to engrave a reproduction of the painting, and its distribution among anti-annexation activists met with great public acclaim. On 31 July 1871 Le Siècle devoted an article to the painting, in which Jules-Antoine Castagnary recounted that Gambetta said "That's my fiancée!" when showing the painting to friends who visited him.

The title of the painting was a reference to the last words of the mayor of Strasbourg, Jean Kuss. Meeting Gambetta at the temporary French parliament building in Bordeaux, he said “let me grasp your patriot’s hand. It is the last time I shall shake it. My heart is broken. Promise to redeem brave Strasbourg. Alsace awaits you! (Alsace vous attend).” He fainted and fell to the ground, was lifted into a carriage but died on the road back to his hotel.

== Significance ==
Henner became well known and popular thanks to the widely circulated engravings of his work. This painting had more impact on him than his 1858 Prix de Rome: "All of France recognised in this figure the personification of lost Alsace [...] Reproduced in a thousand forms, the Alsatian woman was for Henner what Le Passant was for François Coppée; it gave him popularity", wrote Louis Louviot in 1912. The painting held iconic status in France around 1900. When Léon Lhermitte was elected to fill Henner’s place in the Academy of Fine Arts, his speech in honour of his predecessor emphasised the importance of l’Alsace, which had been “copied, photographed, engraved [and] lithographed to such an extent that it was everywhere in France.”

The patriotic theme of lost Alsace was picked up by other painters: Gustave Doré painted Wounded Alsace, exhibited at the Salon of 1872, and Henner’s associate Jean Benner painted To France, Always, around 1906. The defeat of 1871 and the loss of Alsace ashes significant public trauma. The lost territory became central to the shaping of a new national consciousness. Henner’s painting established the artistic vision of Alsace - an image of mourning, embodied by the figure of an Alsatian woman wearing the large black mourning bow, to which were added patriotic and republican symbols such as the cockade or the rooster. Beyond the realm of fine art, hope for the return of the lost territory was also maintained into the 20th century by a significant production of objects such as busts of Alsatian women, toys, school textbooks and postcards, all of which kept it present in the national memory.

== Description ==
The painting, unusually large and vertical (60 cm by 30 cm), seems to enclose the subject. Dark in tone, only the face is illuminated, and the tricolor cockade in her bonnet is the sole touch of color. There are no backgrounds, no accessories, no jewelry; just a young girl in mourning, grave and resolute—the model was 16 years old—gazing directly at the viewer. This prompted art critic Jules-Antoine Castagnary to declare "She is not an Alsatian woman, she is Alsace itself!"

Henner made several copies of this painting, one of which, smaller than the original, is in the collection of the Musée des Beaux-Arts de Mulhouse.
