= Many Benner =

French painter

Many Benner (Emmanuel Michel Benner)
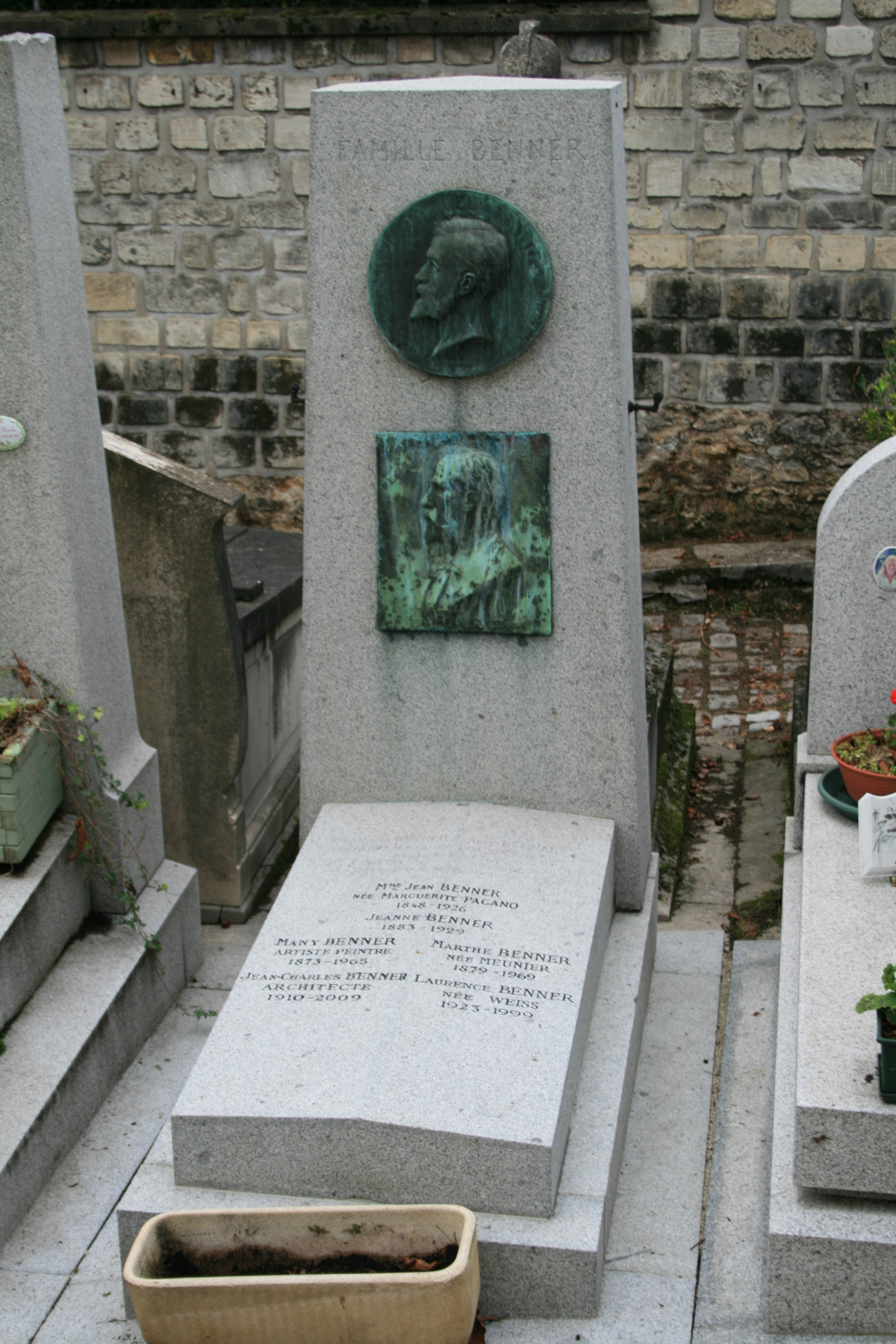
- The grave of Jean, Emmanuel, and Many Benner
- Born: July 17, 1873; Capri, Italy
- Died: November 12, 1965 (aged 92); Paris, France
- Resting place: Père Lachaise Cemetery
- Style: Academic art

Emmanuel Michel Benner, known as Many Benner (17 July 1873, in Capri – 12 November 1965, in Paris), was a French painter. The son of Jean Benner (whose father was also called Jean Benner), Many was the nephew of his father's twin brother, also named Emmanuel Benner. All four Benners were painters.

Benner was born on the Italian island of Capri, where his father then lived as a member of a colony of artists. A very precocious painter, he studied with Jean-Jacques Henner, Jean-Joseph Benjamin-Constant, Jules Joseph Lefebvre and Tony Robert-Fleury (all acquaintances of his father and his uncle) before entering the École des Beaux-Arts at age 16. He achieved second place in the Grand Prix de Rome in 1894, and again in 1898. He later won medals at the Paris Salons of 1902 and 1905.

Many Benner also served as the first director of the Musée national Jean-Jacques Henner. Some of his paintings are kept in the Musée des Beaux-Arts de Mulhouse.
