= Salome (Henner) =

Painting by Jean-Jacques Henner

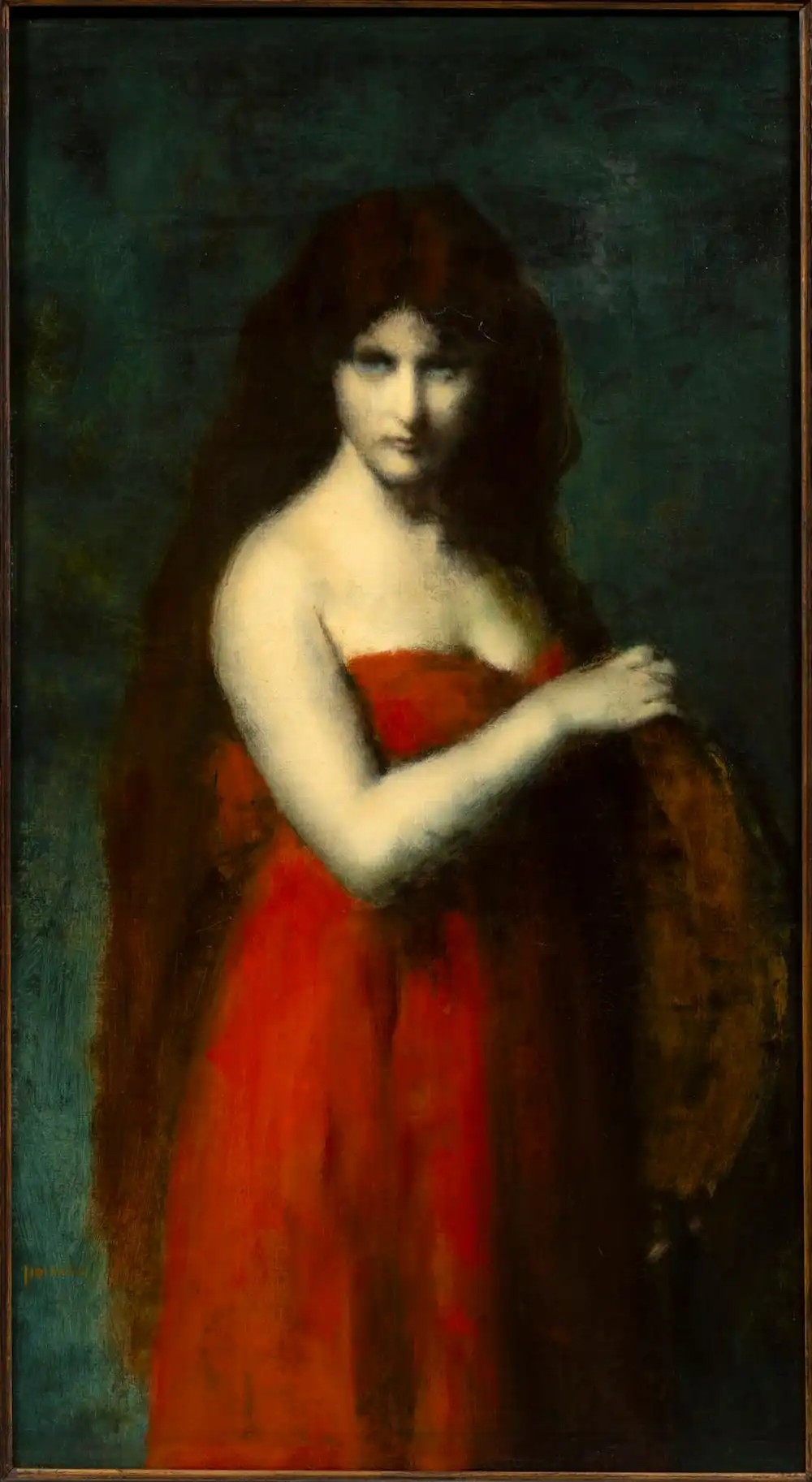
- Artist: Jean-Jacques Henner
- Year: 1904
- Medium: oil on canvas
- Dimensions: 109 cm × 68.5 cm (43 in × 27.0 in)
- Location: Musée national Jean-Jacques Henner, Paris

Salome, a later variant is an oil on canvas painting by the French painter Jean-Jacques Henner, from 1904. It depicts Salome, a figure from the New Testament.

== History and description ==
Dressed in a red gown, a young woman is depicted standing against a bottle-green background, which in places is as dark as her very long hair. Under her left arm she holds the platter on which she was to place the head of John the Baptist at the request of her mother Herodias. Chantal Vérin comments:

”Henner's heroine generally appears as a spectral, vaporous figure without precise features. In the aforementioned painting, the purple of her garment is tinged with brown, and her red hair frames the milky white of her face. The background is uniformly dark. There is no bloody severed head, no decorative effect, no context that could anchor the composition in an identifiable reality. Only the sketch of the platter carried under her arm allows us to recognize Salome. Whether in charcoal drawings or sketches, the numerous variations on the subject, including a depiction in a blue dress, always steer clear of the tragedy of the decapitation. Henner rejects grandiose effects and favors suggestion. He delivers a singular and refined version of Salome, possessing great plastic power and a modernity that sets him apart from his contemporaries.

Purchased in 2024 through a crowdfunding campaign, the work is kept at the Musée national Jean-Jacques Henner, in Paris. It was the main feature of a 2026 special exhibition contrasting the representations of Salome by Henner and his contemporary Gustave Moreau.

Henner created several paintings on the theme of Salome and those around her. Around 1887, he painted a Herodias, also held in the Henner Museum. Around 1890, he painted another Salome, currently held at the Hood Museum of Art in Hanover, New Hampshire. This is why the 1904 version is considered a later variant.

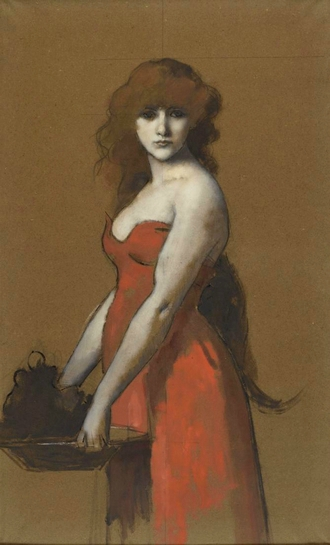
Herodias (Henner)– Musée national Jean-Jacques Henner

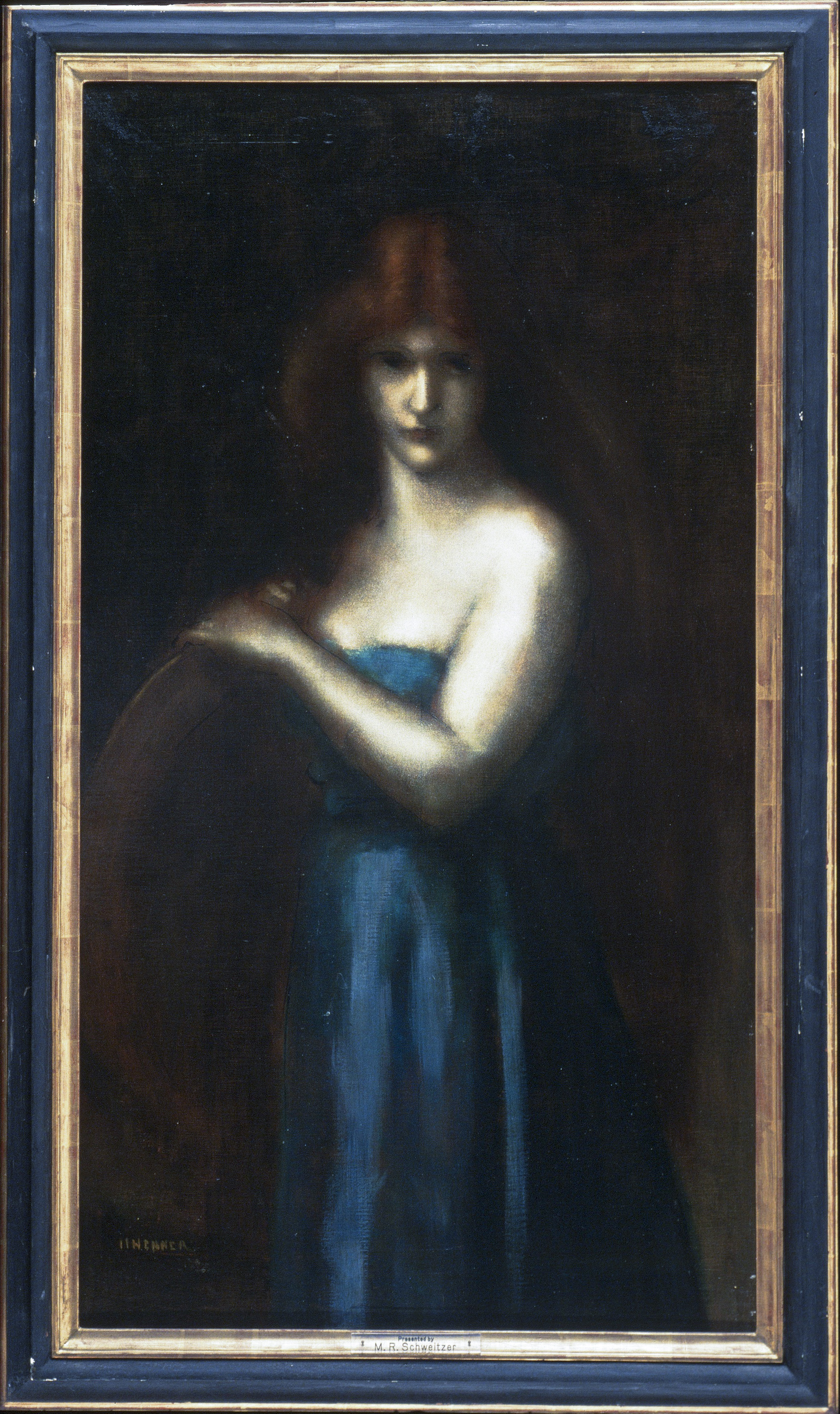
Salome– Hood Museum of Art
