= Woman on a Black Divan =

Painting by Jean-Jacques Henner

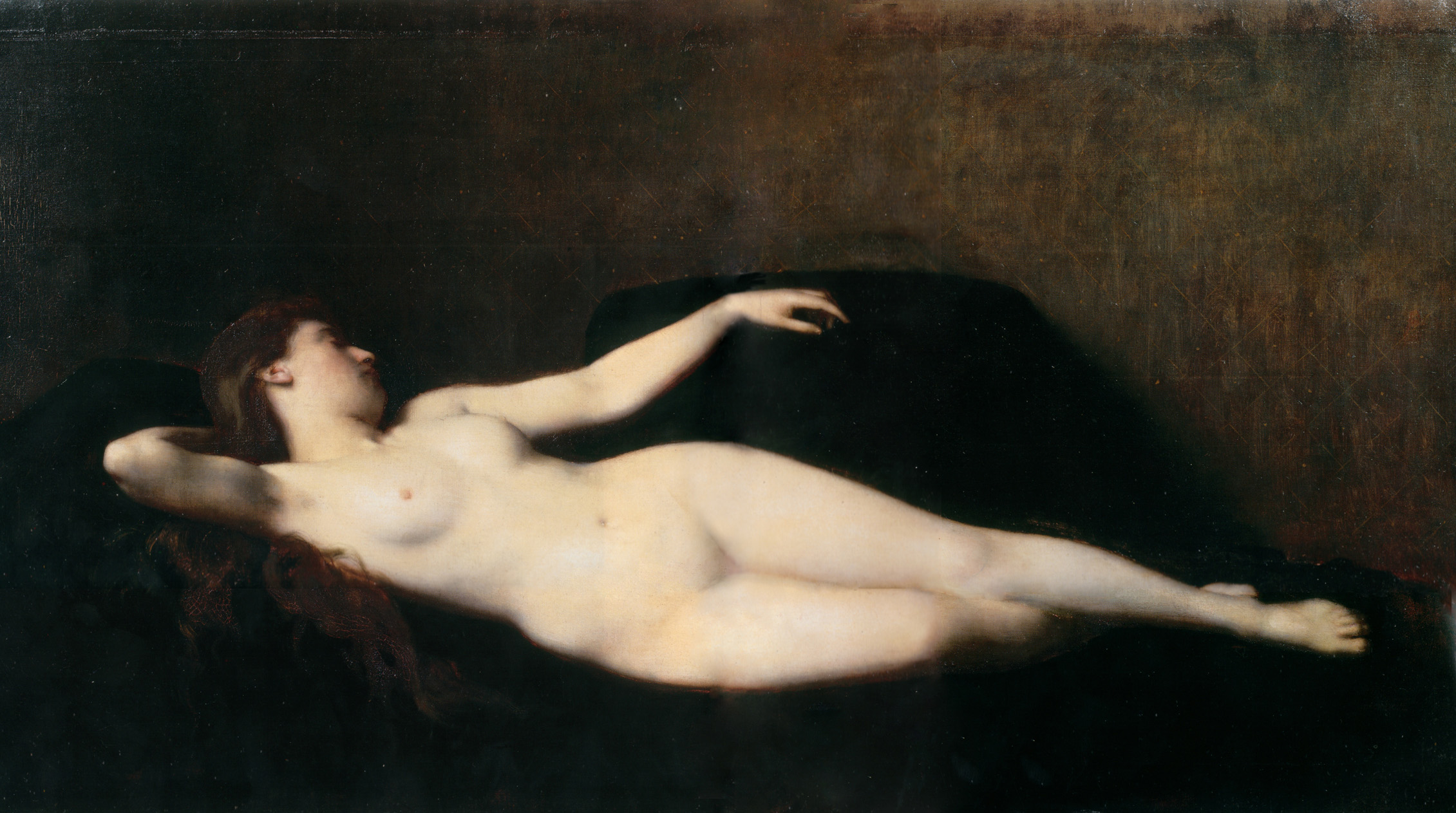
- Artist: Jean-Jacques Henner
- Year: 1869
- Medium: oil on canvas
- Movement: Academic art nude
- Subject: A naked woman on a divan
- Dimensions: 93 cm × 180 cm (37 in × 71 in)
- Location: Musée des Beaux-Arts; Mulhouse
- Accession: 1869

Woman on a Black Divan (French: La femme au divan noir), also known simply as Recumbent Woman (Femme couchée) is an oil on canvas painting by the French artist Jean-Jacques Henner, from 1869. It is one of the Henner paintings of the Musée des Beaux-Arts of Mulhouse. Its inventory number is D.58.1.22.

== Description ==
This canvas depicts a nude woman lying on a black sofa, with her right arm behind her head and the other outstretched. There is a great contrast between the model's body, highlighted by the brightness, and the sofa, whose dark color partially unites it with the background. This characteristic of the contrasts between a lit nude figure and the shadow of the background is present in other works by the painter. Henner, in fact, favored the female nude and chiaroscuro, as he would do in his later works.

== Provenance ==
The painting was shown at the Paris Salon of 1869, and bought for the collection of the Société industrielle de Mulhouse (from which the Musée des Beaux-Arts originated) by the widow of Daniel Dollfus the same year. A much smaller version of the painting is kept in the Musée national Jean-Jacques Henner, in Paris, since 1923.
