= Louis Schittly =

French physician and humanitarian (1938–2025)

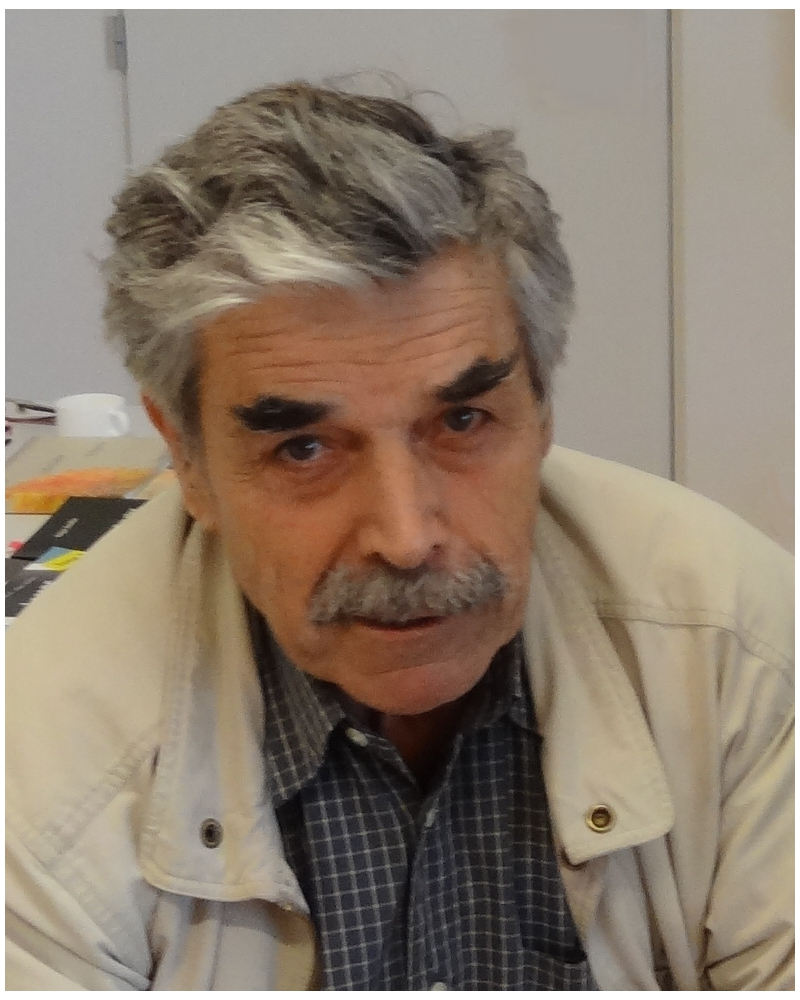
- Schittly in 2018
- Born: Louis Henri Marie Schittly; 7 July 1938; Bernwiller, Alsace, France
- Died: 1 January 2025 (aged 86); Mulhouse, France
- Occupation: Physician
- Known for: Cofounder of Médecins Sans Frontières
- Awards: Knight of the Legion of Honour; Nobel Peace Prize laureate

Louis Schittly (7 July 1938 – 1 January 2025) was a French physician and humanitarian. He was one of the founders of Médecins Sans Frontières. Schittly died on 1 January 2025 in Mulhouse at the age of 86.

During his career, Schittly worked in Biafra, Ivory Coast, Vietnam, Afghanistan, Mali, Serbia and South Sudan.

== Early life and education ==
Louis Schittly was born in Altkirch, France, on July 7, 1938 and grew up on his parents' farm in Bernwiller in the Sundgau region of Alsace. His father had been a soldier in the German army during the First World War, first on the Eastern Front (World War I) and then in the Somme. His mother lost three brothers and sisters to a French bombing raid on August 10, 1915. His family took in a German prisoner of war. His brother Jean-Pierre spent thirty months as a soldier during the Algerian War near Souk Ahras.

Schittly considered becoming a missionary, but fell in love during a stay of adoration at Mont Sainte-Odile, and abandoned this vocation.

After studying at the minor seminary of Zillisheim, he went to study medicine in Strasbourg and then in Lille, where he defended his thesis on June 4, 1968. In March 1968, he obtained a scholarship from the Roux Foundation of the Pasteur Institute in Paris and then took courses in medical entomology at ORSTOM. He joined the May 68 movement of civil unrest in Paris.

== Career ==
=== Biafra ===
In December 1968, Schittly volunteered to join the Red Cross for a mission in Biafra, which had been ravaged by a famine. He embarked with a Slovak surgeon colleague and was dropped off in a pediatric hospital in Santana, joining Jean Picard, Michel Castet, Anne-Marie Barbé, and Guy Hanon. The hospital was a nutrition center treating children with nutritional deficiencies, scabies, intestinal parasites and malaria who had a high mortality rate at around 10%.

The hospital was set up in former classrooms converted into hospital wards with eight beds that held between five and eight children, and they carried out 4,000-5,000 consultations per week. There was a kitchen, a laundry room, a pharmacy and a laboratory, three trucks, three cars and two motorcycles, a carpentry workshop and, to feed the patients, a large vegetable garden with banana and cassava fields and a goat farm. The team was made up of French aid workers who stayed on average between two and four months, 28 local nurses, and auxiliaries in charge of cleaning, security, 6 laboratory technicians and auxiliaries, and a team of cooks and handymen.

At Uli, the airport where international aid arrived in Biafra, Schittly encountered the horror of war, particularly the bombings by East German mercenaries.

After Jean Picard left, Schittly was appointed team leader. Three or four times a week he went into the bush with the help of Irish Missionaries of the Holy Spirit to care for the inhabitants and to pick up children to be treated at the hospital; in dry weather, 110 children were transported, and during rainy weather 35 children. It was during these tours that Bernard Kouchner accompanied him.

In January 1970, the ICRC requested a general evacuation. At that time, Schittly and 3 others remained. On 5 January, the general evacuation order was given, they had to go to Libreville and Sao Tomé. Schittly initially decided to evacuate with 120 children, but the Swiss and the Swedes refused to embark with them and so Schittly also decided to stay. While waiting for the armistice, the team took refuge in an Irish mission. On January 7, 1970, the war was over, the authorities told them that they could go to Santana without worries. They met Baron Hunt, who was on an official means-testing tour. After a meeting with the governor of Port Harcourt, the children were transferred from Santana to Port Harcourt, where the governor had allowed them to transform an old school into a hospital. Following a rumor that these doctors were mercenaries, Schittly and his colleagues were transferred to Lagos for questioning by the judicial police, then put under surveillance in a hotel in town. Since France could not intervene because of its recognition of the State of Biafra, they were tried and found guilty of illegal entry into Nigeria and sentenced to six months in prison and a fine. After fifteen days in prison, they were deported to France.

=== Ivory Coast, 1970 ===
The Order of Malta offered Schittly the position of chief physician for three camps for Biafran refugee children in Ivory Coast. He immediately accepted and spent a week in each of the three refugee camps, monitoring the health of the children until December 1970, when the children were repatriated. He left Ivory Coast before Christmas 1970, and returned via Upper Volta, Gao, Niamey, Agadez, Arlit, to Algiers, which took him three months.

After his return from Biafra, he considered to specialize in paediatrics. In April 1970, thanks to the elders of Biafra and Parisian friends and supporters of Bernard Kouchner, the foundation of the Groupement d'intervention d'intervention medical-surgicale d'urgence was decided, later becoming MSF.

=== Vietnam, 1971-72 ===
In 1971, having no desire to settle down as a country doctor, Schittly decided to help in Vietnam, joining the Da Nang hospital of the German Order of Malta. While waiting for the hospital to be built, German personnel worked in Hoi An at the Catholic bishopric where they had built a pediatric dispensary.

Joel Lugern offered to work for the Viet Cong as a doctor, and arranged an interview with the head of the Sector 3 maquis. Following a security investigation carried out by Georges Marchais on his militant activity in France, Schittly was recruited six weeks later to steal medicines from the hospital cellar, remove the German labels, translate them into French, load the boxes into a jeep, drive about ten kilometers from the city, stop to take a photo, while they steal the medicines and then return to the hospital, as if nothing had happened. He regularly goes on missions with another doctor to treat people with leprosy.

During Easter 1972, Schittly witnessed the great Viet Cong Easter Offensive and narrowly escaped arrest. In June 1972, his contract was not renewed, and his return trip took him to Saigon, Phnom Penh, through Thailand, Burma, Laos, Hong Kong, the Philippines, Taiwan, Borneo, Indonesia, Sri Lanka, India, Nepal, Pakistan, Afghanistan, Iran and Turkey in over five months.

After returning from Vietnam, Schittly spent four years from 1973-1977 to specialize in ophthalmology.

=== Later life ===
In June 1980, Schittly participated in an exploratory mission to Afghanistan funded by Terre des Hommes Alsace. After a stopover in Karachi, while waiting to cross the border at Peshawar they established a makeshift hospital treating about 50 people per day. In Chitral, the group consisted of about 20 people and walked six days 50 km per day across mountain passes of more than 4000 m, avoiding a group of Taliban, led by Gulbuddin Hekmatyar, responsible for the Surobi ambush. At their destination they treated many cases of TB and intestinal parasites. The return in September was complicated by four Soviet helicopters, which fired at them.

From 1981 to 2009 Schittly worked as a chief physician of a convalescent house in Sentheim while living with his family on the family farm in Bernwiller.

In December 1987/ January 1988 Schittly participated in ateh first transport of agricultural, medical and school equipment to Mali by a group called TransAfrica.

In 1996, Bernard Kouchner asked Louis Schittly for help to set up a clinic, following the appeal of Sister Emmanuelle. On 30 August 1996, Louis and Bernard left for Nairobi. Welcomed by Pierre Géhot, they left the next day for Lokichokio. Then Monseigneur Taban took them to South Sudan. After several visits to the area, it was agreed that the clinic should be set up in Bona.

For six years, the clinic treated varied health conditions encountered locally, operating from 6 a.m. to 2 p.m.; Louis recruited several doctors via France Blue Alsace. Later as a result of embezzlement by trustees, an English NGO took over.

== Personal life and death ==
Schittly had three children: Manuela, born from a liaison during his studies in Strasbourg, Martha and Jean-Baptiste, with Erika, an ethnologist specializing in Papua New Guinea.

In Biafra, he was in a relationship with Esther, an indigenous woman who after the war became a nurse at the hospital Enugu.

In Vietnam, he was in a relationship with Heidi, a German nurse.

After a life of a practicing Catholic, he became an atheist, then he converted to orthodoxy in 1981 under the name Grégoire "Gregory", at the same time as his friend René Ehni, at the monastery of Gregory of Mount Athos. Together with his wife renamed Anastasia and his son, he built a small Byzantine church in his orchard, dedicated to Saint Gregory the Athonite and to Saint Anastasia the Roman, and decorated with frescoes and Byzantine icons painted by Léonide Ouspensky.

In politics, he defined himself as an anarchist and had deep respect for the Amish.

Schittly died in Mulhouse on 1 January 2025 at the age of 86.

== Publications ==
- L'homme qui voulait voir la guerre de près. Médecin au Biafra, Vietnam, Afghanistan, Sud-Soudan. Paris : Arthaud, 2011 ISBN 978-2-0812-5841-9
- Fyirr et Nadala, Conte bilingue [Français/Alsacien]. Mulhouse : Éditions du Rhin, 1996. ISBN 2-86339-115-1
- Dr Näsdla ou Un automne sans colchiques, Roman à lire à voix haute, Éditions Hortus Sundgauviae, 1983. ISBN 2-86339-011-2. Nouvelle édition Strasbourg, La Nuée Bleue/DNA, 2013. ISBN 978-2-7165-0810-0. Trad. all.: Näsdla oder Ein Herbst ohne Herbstzeitlosen. Hambourg: tredition, 2019 ISBN 978-3-7482-1790-9
- La raison lunatique [with René Ehni]. Presses d'Aujourd'hui, 1978
