= Jean Benner =

French painter

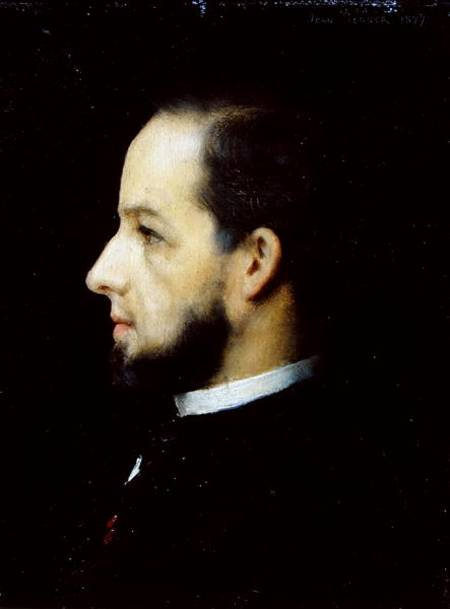
- Benner in 1877 (painting by Jean-Jacques Henner, Musée des Beaux-Arts de Mulhouse)
- Born: March 28, 1836; Mulhouse, France
- Died: October 28, 1906 (aged 70); Paris, France
- Resting place: Père Lachaise Cemetery
- Notable work: L'Extase; Salomé
- Style: Academic art

Jean Benner (28 March 1836 – 28 October 1906) was a French artist. He was twin to fellow artist, Emmanuel Benner, and the father of Emmanuel M. Benner, another artist.

== Early life ==
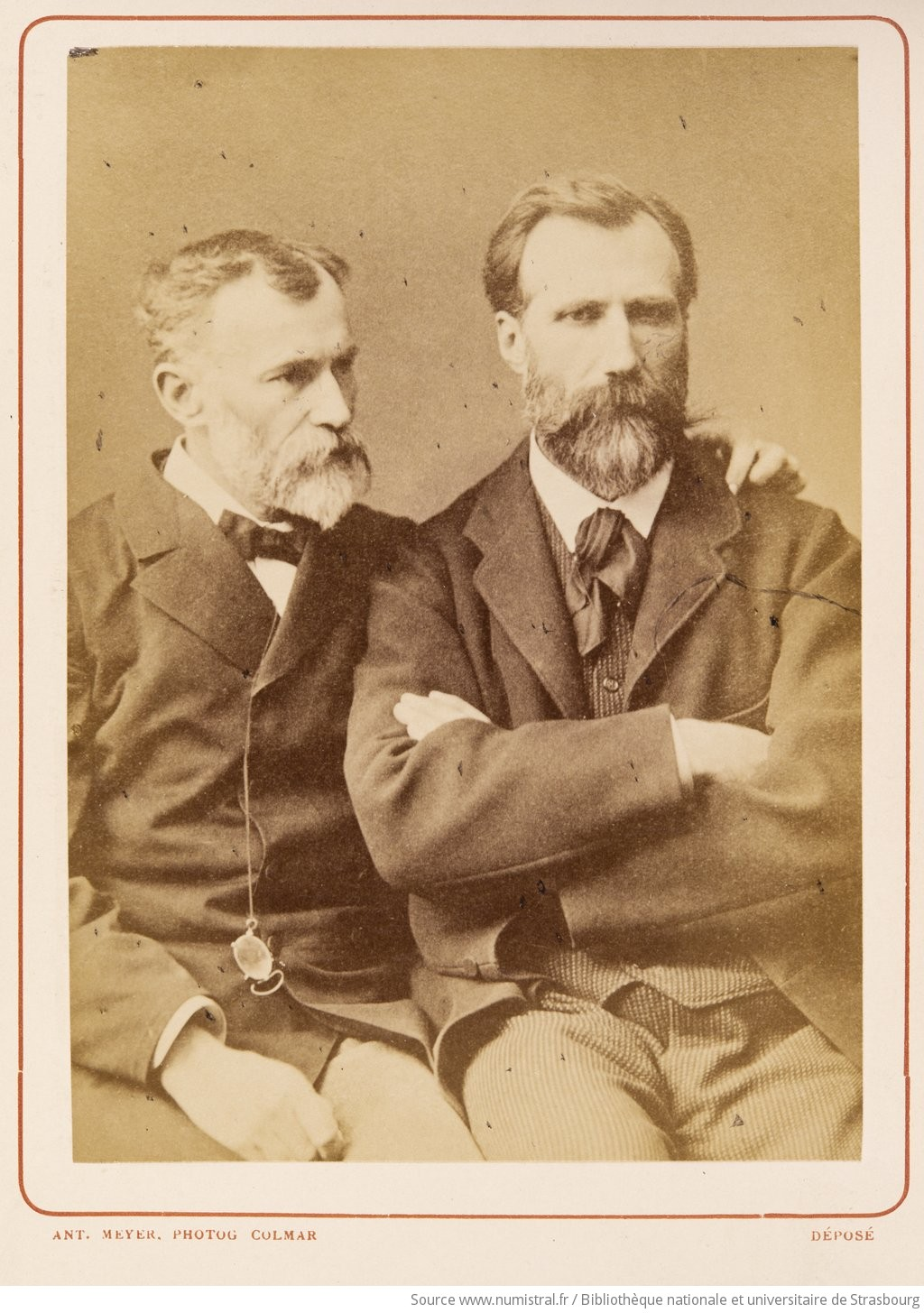
Emmanuel and Jean Benner, 1883, National and University Library of Strasbourg

Twins Jean and Emmanuel Benner were born in March 1836 in Mulhouse, Alsace, France to Jean Benner-Fries.

== Career ==
The Benner brothers were first designers at Mulhouse mills and factories. By 30 years of age, Jean was able to study art with Léon Bonnat, Eck and Jean-Jacques Henner and exhibited at the Paris Salon of 1868. In 1881 he won his first medal there for this painting Le Repos.

He painted still-life, portrait and genre paintings, including After a Storm at Capri (1872), Trappist in Prayer (1875), Petite Falle de Capri, Flowers and Fruits (1868), and Reverie.

He also painted in the Isle of Capri, which was an artist colony at that time, its residents included Frederic Leighton, Walter McLaren, John Singer Sargent, Edouard Alexandre Sain, and Sophie Gengembre Anderson.

Benner died in 1906 in Paris.

== Works ==
- A house in Capri, 1881, Fine Arts Museum, Pau
- Women of Capri, 1882, Musée des Beaux-Arts de Mulhouse. Remarkable for its heroic size, quite unusual for a genre painting: 270 cm (110 in) by 171 cm (67 in).
- Briseis weeping over the body of Patroclus, 1878, château-musée, Nemours
- Ecstasy, c. 1896, Strasbourg Museum of Modern and Contemporary Art
- Girl in Capri, 1906, Fine Arts Museum of Nantes
- Hollyhocks, Musée d'art et d'archéologie, Senlis
- Les Pêcheurs, Musée d'art moderne André Malraux, Le Havre
- Portrait of Jean-Jacques Henner, 1899, Fine Arts Museum, Mulhouse
- Portrait of Emmanuel Benner, Fine Arts Museum of Nantes
- Salomé, Fine Arts Museum of Nantes
- To France, always, Fine Arts Museum, Mulhouse

== Gallery ==
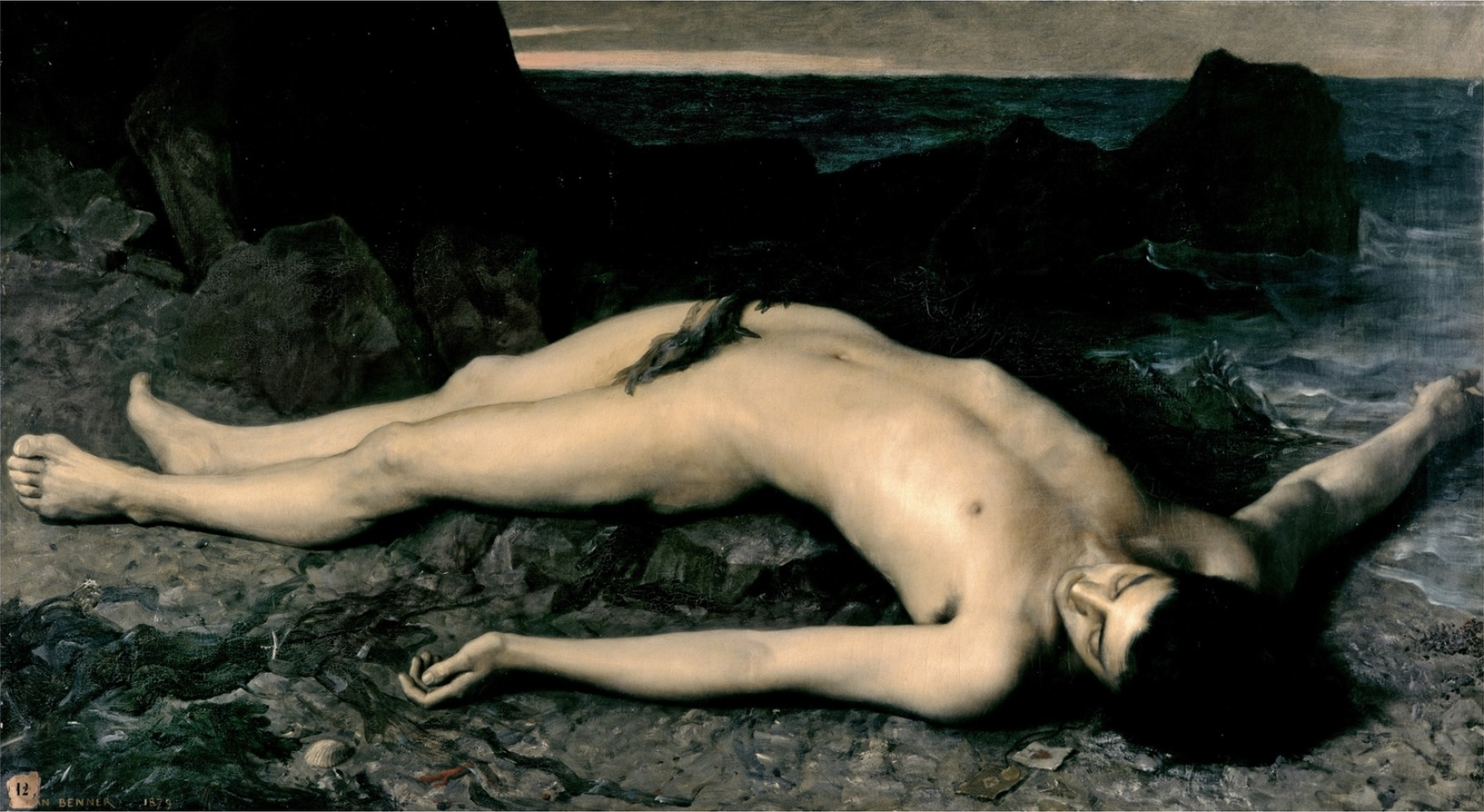
The Wreck, or The Italian, 1879, Musée Petiet de Limoux

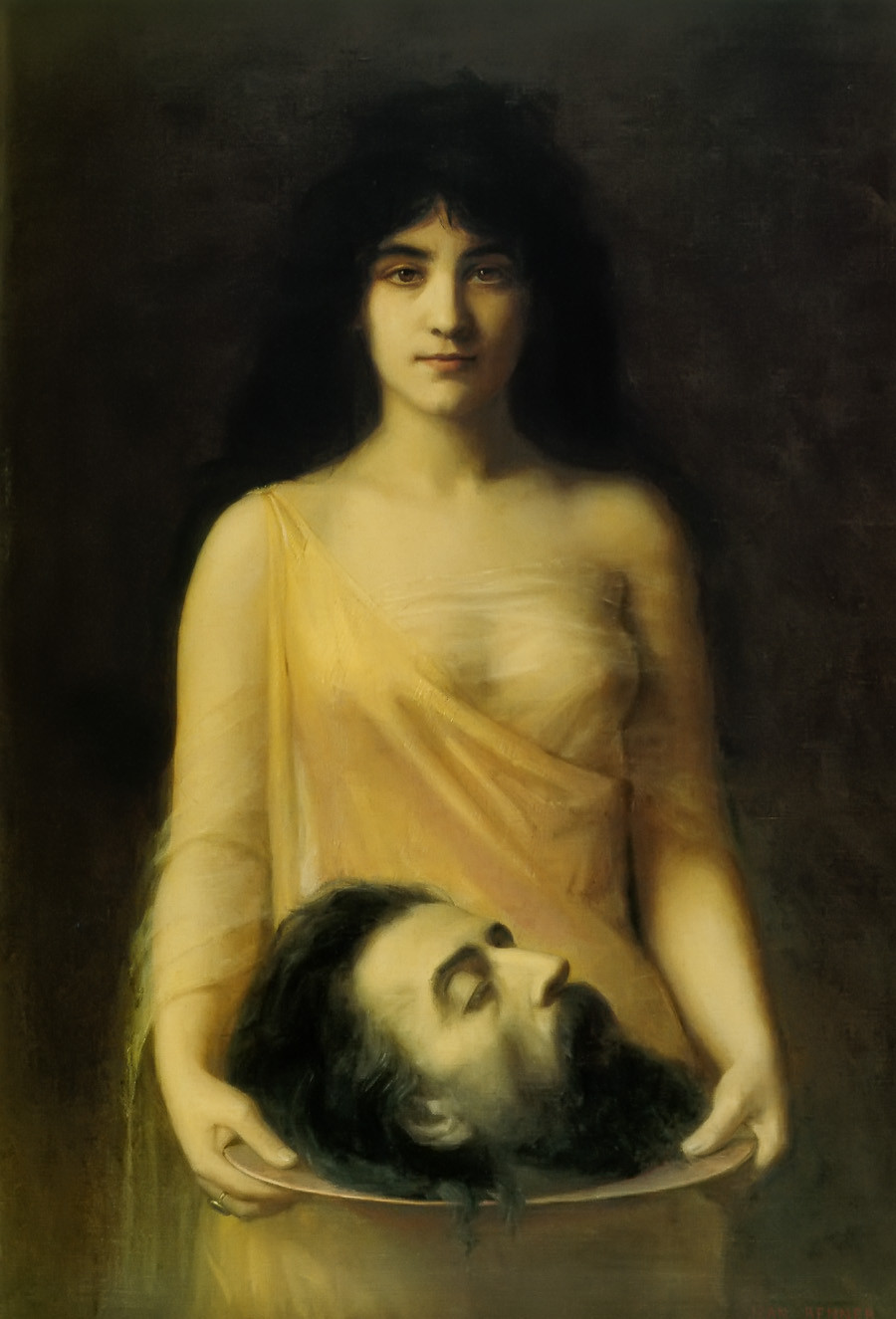
Salomé, ca. 1899, Fine Arts Museum of Nantes

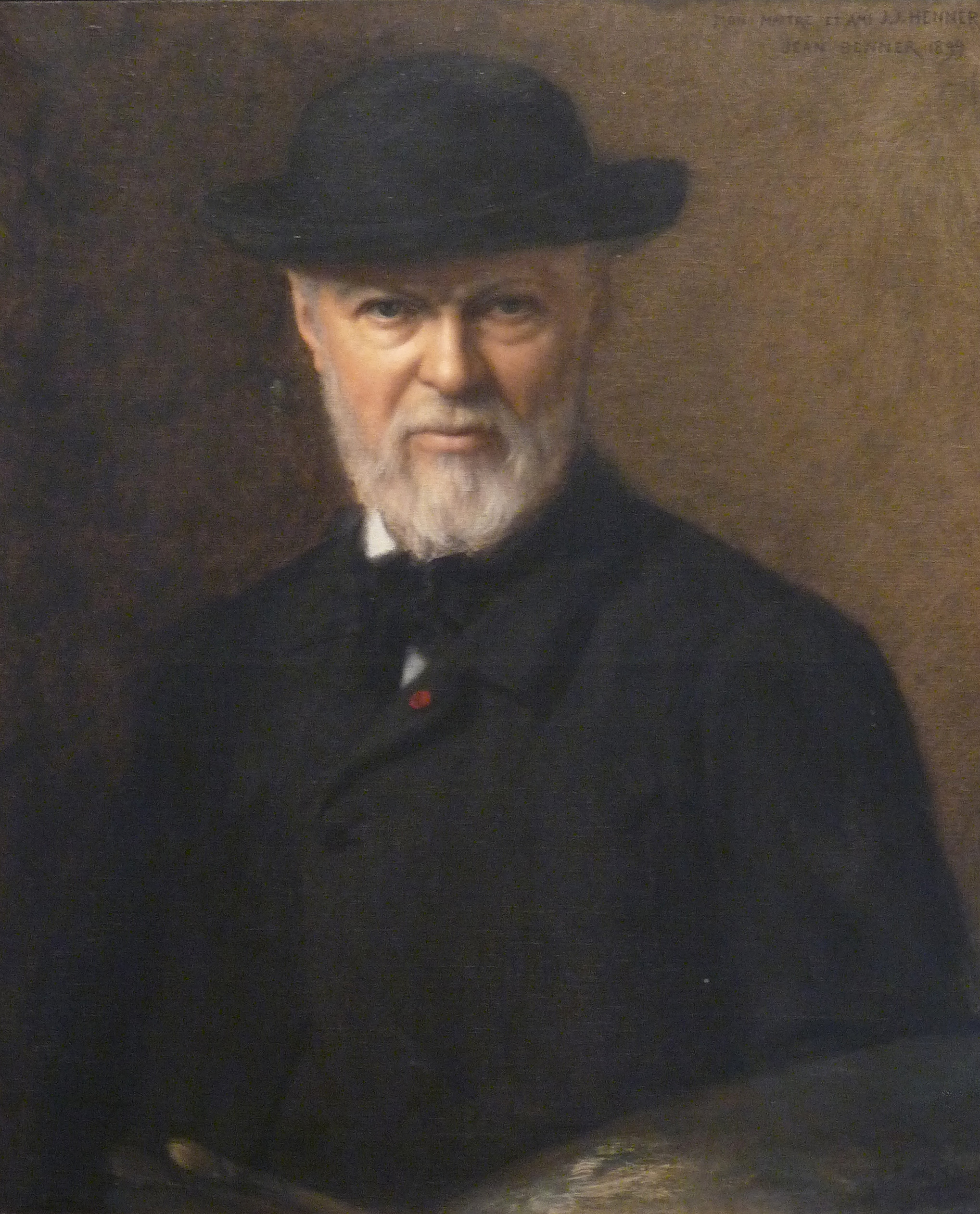
Portrait of Jean-Jacques Henner, 1899

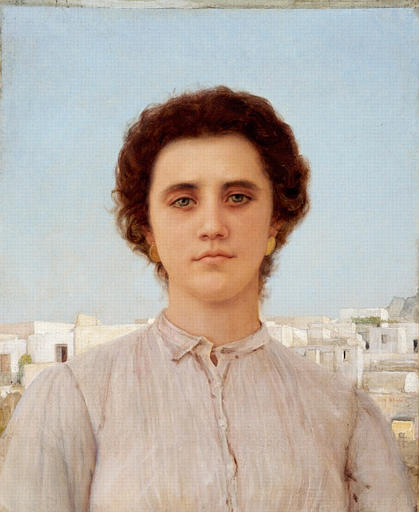
Girl in Capri, 1906, Fine Arts Museum of Nantes

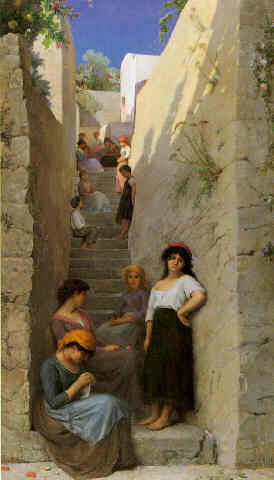
A dark corner in Capri

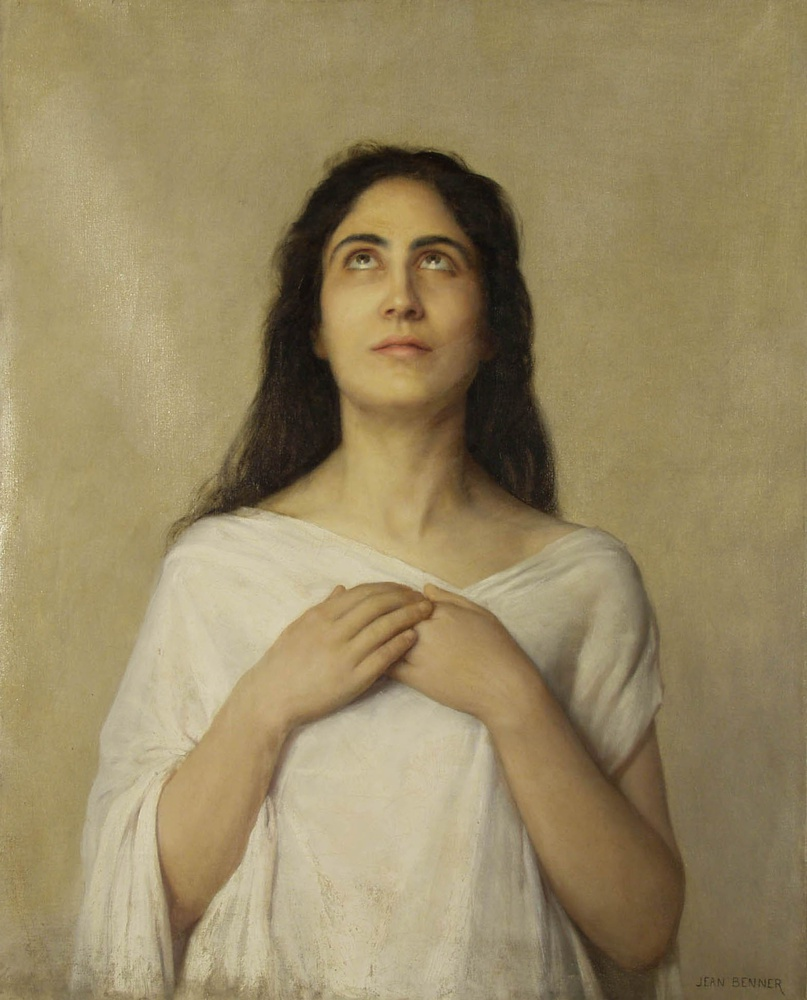
Ecstasy, Strasbourg Museum of Modern and Contemporary Art

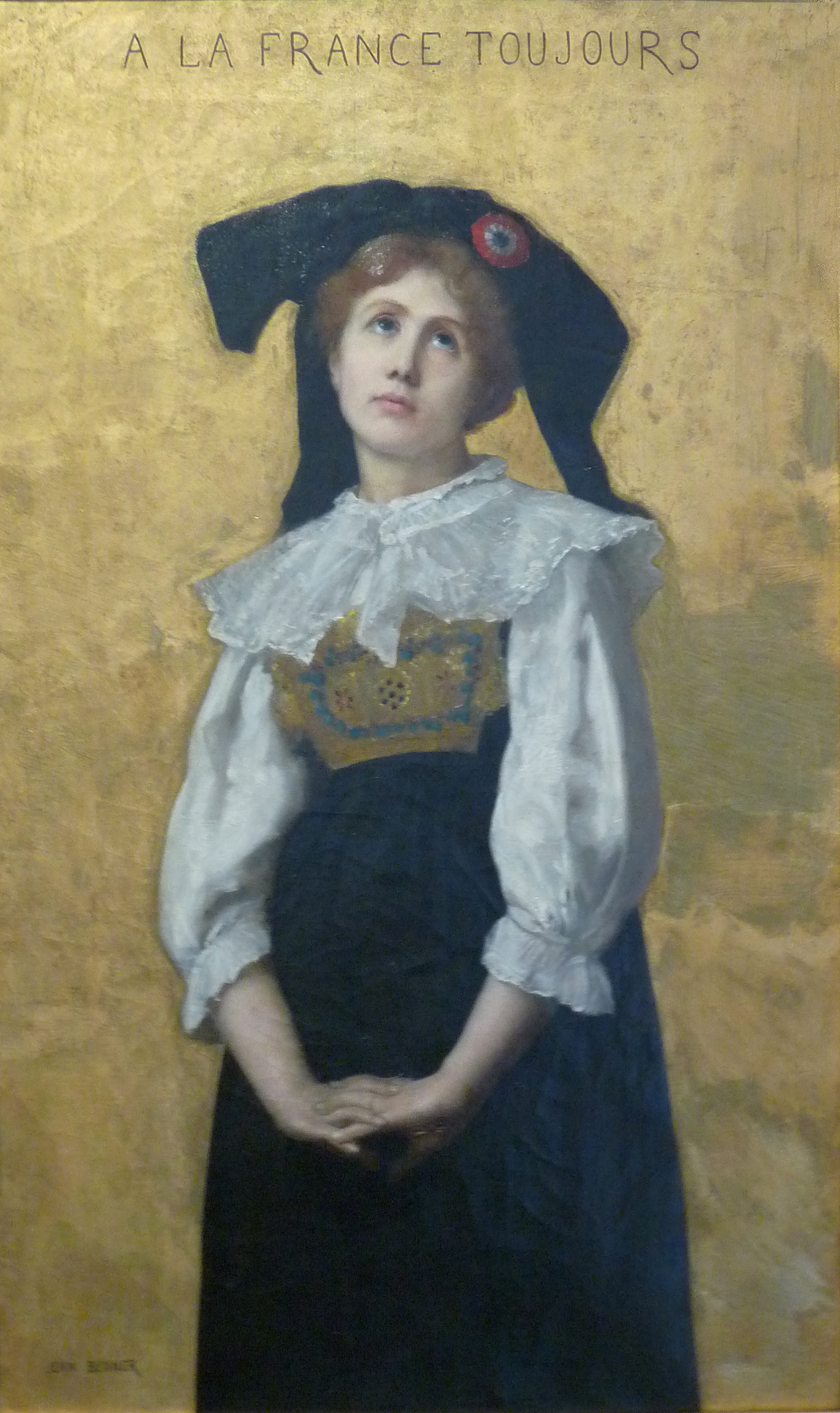
To France, always

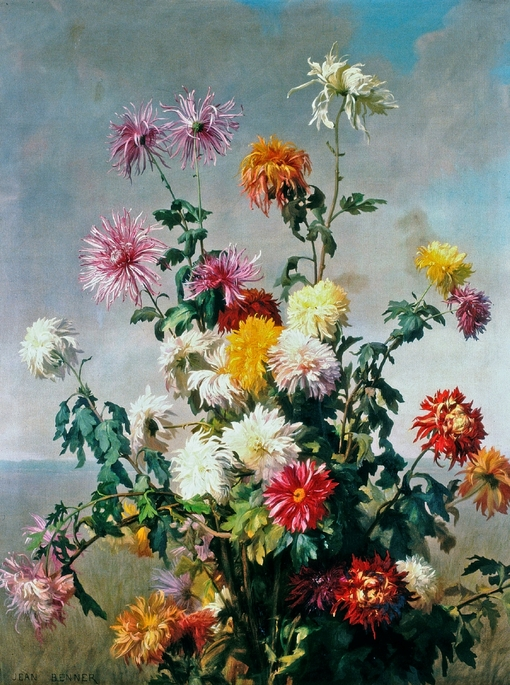
Study of Flowers, oil on canvas, Laing Art Gallery

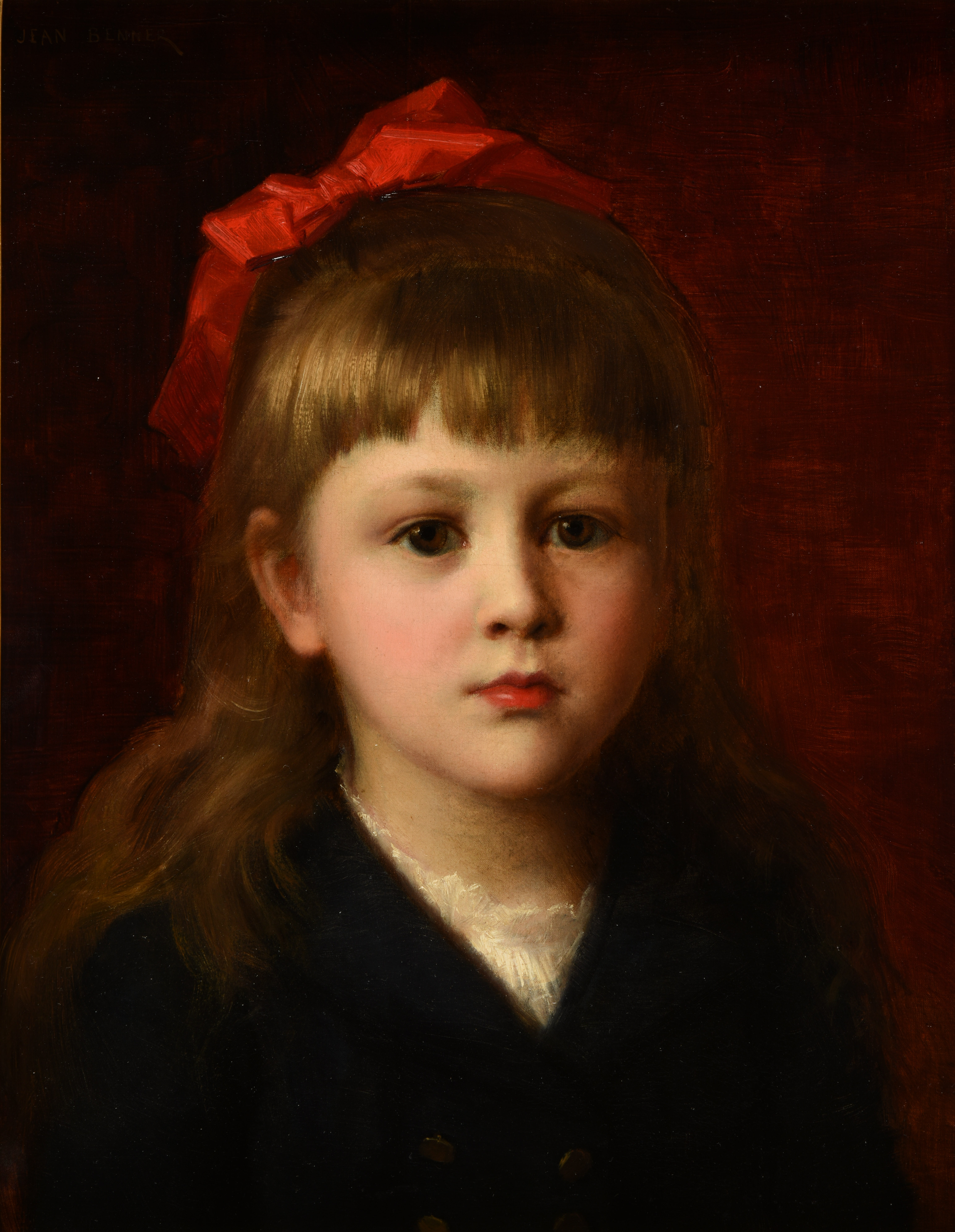
Little girl, Museum of Fine Arts, Reims
