= Ammertzwiller =

Part of Bernwiller in Grand Est, France

- Part of Bernwiller
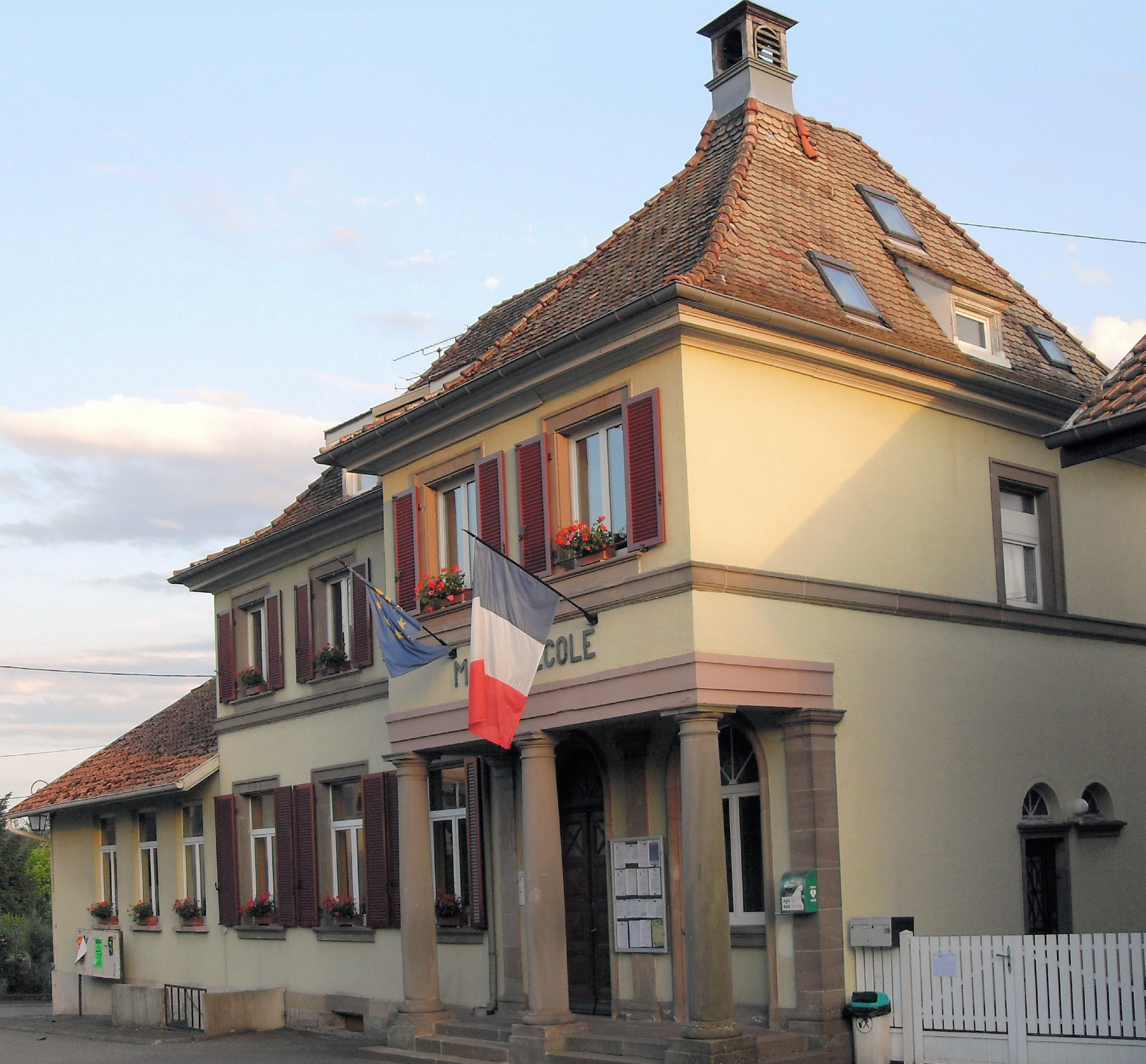
- Town hall

- Coat of arms
- Location of Ammertzwiller
- Location within France Location within Grand Est
- Coordinates: 47°41′23″N 7°10′05″E
- Country: France
- Region: Grand Est
- Department: Haut-Rhin
- Arrondissement: Altkirch
- Canton: Masevaux-Niederbruck
- Commune: Bernwiller
- Area^{1}: 3.05 km^{2} (1.18 sq mi)
- Elevation: 300 m (980 ft)
- Highest elevation: 307 m (1,007 ft)
- Lowest elevation: 286 m (938 ft)
- Population (2022): 486
  - Density: 159/km^{2} (413/sq mi)
- Time zone: UTC+01:00 (CET)
  - Summer (DST): UTC+02:00 (CEST)
- Postal code: 68210
- ^{1} French Land Register data, which excludes lakes, ponds, glaciers > 1 km^{2} (0.386 sq mi or 247 acres) and river estuaries.

Ammertzwiller (before 2015: Ammerzwiller, German: Ammerzweiler, Alsatian: Àmmerzwiller) is a former commune in the Haut-Rhin department in north-eastern France. On 1 January 2016, it was merged into the commune Bernwiller.

== See also ==
- Communes of the Haut-Rhin department
