= Herodias (Henner) =

Painting by Jean-Jacques Henner

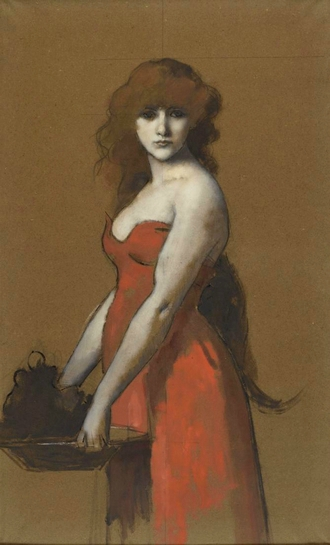
- Artist: Jean-Jacques Henner
- Year: c. 1887
- Medium: oil and charcoal on paper mounted on canvas
- Dimensions: 109 cm × 68.5 cm (43 in × 27.0 in)
- Location: Musée national Jean-Jacques Henner, Paris

Herodias (French: Hérodiade) is a painting by Jean-Jacques Henner completed around 1887. It is held at the Musée national Jean-Jacques Henner, in Paris.

== Description ==
This oil and charcoal painting on paper mounted on canvas is a study for a painting of the same name that was exhibited at the Salon of 1887. (The current whereabouts of this final painting are unknown). Henner often prepared painted studies on paper for his paintings, in order to lay the foundation for the composition. This religious painting depicts Herodias, a princess of the kingdom of Judea mentioned in the New Testament, wearing a long, sleeveless red dress and holding before her a platter on which lies the head of John the Baptist, whose beheading she arranged through her daughter Salome.

The Jewish princess with long red hair turns and stares at the viewer with her large black eyes, as if trying to penetrate the soul of the viewer. The lower part of her body is the one that has remained mostly at the sketch stage, while the arms and the face present nuances and plays of light and shadow that are close to the final work. It has been noted that in this painting Herodias looks like a fifteen-year-old girl, when in the biblical story it is specified that when she asked for the beheading of the Baptist she was old enough to have a daughter.

According to Paul Dollfus, the face of Herodias was based on that of a model called Alice, who is said to have also lent her facial features to Fabiola, another work by Henner.
