= La Liseuse =

Painting by Jean-Jacques Henner

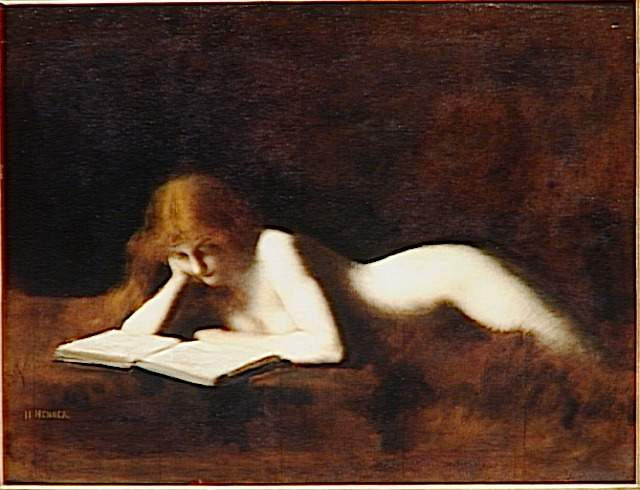
Jean Jacques Henner - La Liseuse

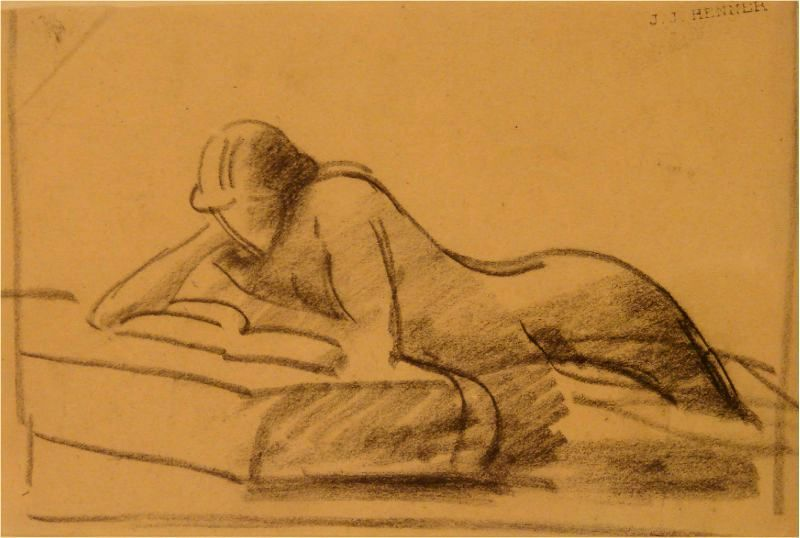
Sketch by Henner for La Liseuse

La Liseuse (The Reader) is an oil-on-canvas painting by French artist Jean-Jacques Henner. It is sometimes also known as Marie-Madeleine Lisant (“Mary Magdalene reading”) and it is Henner’s most famous work.

It was painted around 1883 and was exhibited in the salon of 1883 along with its sister work, La Religieuse. It was bought from the salon by Alfred Chauchard for 20,000 francs. In 1910 it was left to the state in his will and taken into the collections of the Louvre. In 1981 it was assigned to the new Musée d'Orsay and since 2016 it has been on display at the Musée national Jean-Jacques Henner, also in Paris.

A smaller painting by Henner on a wooden panel of the same subject was acquired by fr: Victor Antoine Desfossés and later sold at auction from the Desfossés collection in 1899 for 3,100 francs.

== Composition ==
The model who posed for Henner was Juana Romani.

The painting’s motif of the nude woman recurs many times in Henner’s work, which shows the influence of the Symbolist painters while remaining broadly consistent with his preferred academic style. Henner applied Leonardo da Vinci’s sfumato technique to a remarkable extent, blurring the subject’s body into the dark, smoky atmosphere that surrounds her. The only elements clearly distinguishable are the reader's lustrous body and the blank pages of her book. Her face, full of concentration, is framed by hair that cascades down in abundance and fades into the background.

== Exhibition history ==
The painting has featured in a number of French national and international exhibitions:

- Le siècle des dictionnaires, musée d'Orsay, Paris, 1987
- Jean-Jacques Henner. Face à l'impressionnisme, le dernier des romantiques, musée de la Vie Romantique, Paris, 2007–2008
- Cheveux chéris. Frivolités et trophées, musée du quai Branly, Paris, 2012–2013
- Années croisées France/Corée. Les mondes esthétiques au XIXème siècle, Seoul Arts Center, Séoul, 2016–2017
- Années croisées France/Corée. Les mondes esthétiques du XIXe siècle, National Palace Museum, Taipei, 2017
- Laboratoire d’Europe. Strasbourg, 1880-1930 - musée d'Art moderne et contemporain, Strasbourg, 2017–2018
- Jean-Jacques Henner. La Chair et l'Idéal, Musée des Beaux-Arts de Strasbourg, Strasbourg, 2021–2022

== Critical reception ==
When the painting was first exhibited in 1883, Le Soir commented that Henner had never been so happily inspired. La Presse and L'Illustration described it as a masterpiece. The New York Herald declared it to be "the finest work the artist so far has produced".

Noting the subject’s evident link to representations of Mary Magdalene, Philippe Burty commented that "the sinful woman’s ardent love for her saviour [as expressed through her intense concentration on her book] did not in the least restore her any chastity…. There is no clearer subject than that of the flesh which is unaware of itself."

The painting was criticised by Octave Mirbeau in Le Figaro for being another example of "Mr. Henner's eternal Correggio", the critic having tired of the painter’s ethereal nudes echoing the style of the Italian renaissance master. However Joséphin Péladan, writing about the painting, said he was not one of those who complained of the artist’s lack of variety, and he was not at all put out to find he had the same impressions of Henner’s work year after year at the salon, because that impression was so charming. "Henner" he concluded "is perhaps the most agreeable and the most pleasing to the eye of painters today."

== Derivative works ==
La Liseuse was reproduced in a number of engravings and prints, and inspired a small painting by an artist named Alfieri.
