= Jean Benner-Fries =

French painter (1796–1849)

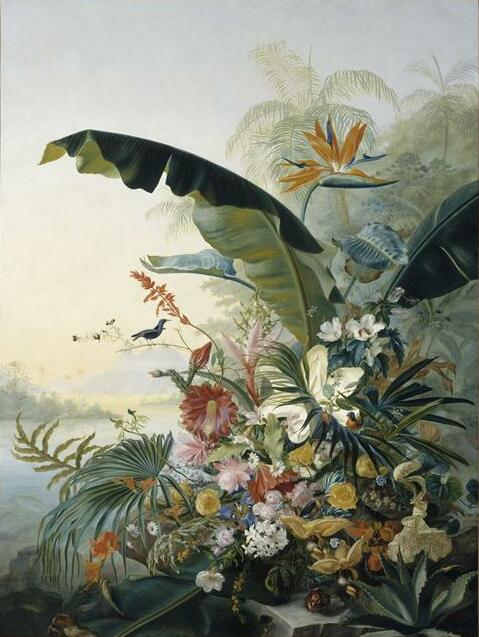
Exotic Flowers, painting by Benner-Fries (Musée de l'impression sur étoffes, Mulhouse)

Jean Benner-Fries, also known as Jean Benner and Jean Benner the elder (1796–1849), was a French painter and textile designer.

== Early life ==
He was born in 1764 Mulhouse, Haut-Rhin, Alsace, or, by other accounts, in Staufen, Switzerland (until 1798, Mulhouse was an independent Republic with stronger ties to Switzerland than to France.)

== Career ==
Benner-Fries was a naturalist painter, with exotic flowers being his preferred subject. Throughout his life, he worked in Paris and England, but was most active in his native town of Mulhouse, where the Musée de l'impression sur étoffes contains many of his works. His works are held in the municipal museums of Mulhouse, Caen, Nice, Bale, Belfort, Bern, Châlons, Colmar, Douai, Le Havre, Limoux, Nantes, Paris, Pau and Strasbourg.

== Personal life ==
Benner-Fries became the father of twin sons, Emmanuel and Jean Benner, themselves both painters, whose works were exhibited at the Paris Salon beginning in 1867.
