= Musée national Jean-Jacques Henner =

Biographical art museum in Paris, France

Coordinates: 48°52′58.7″N 2°18′27.6″E

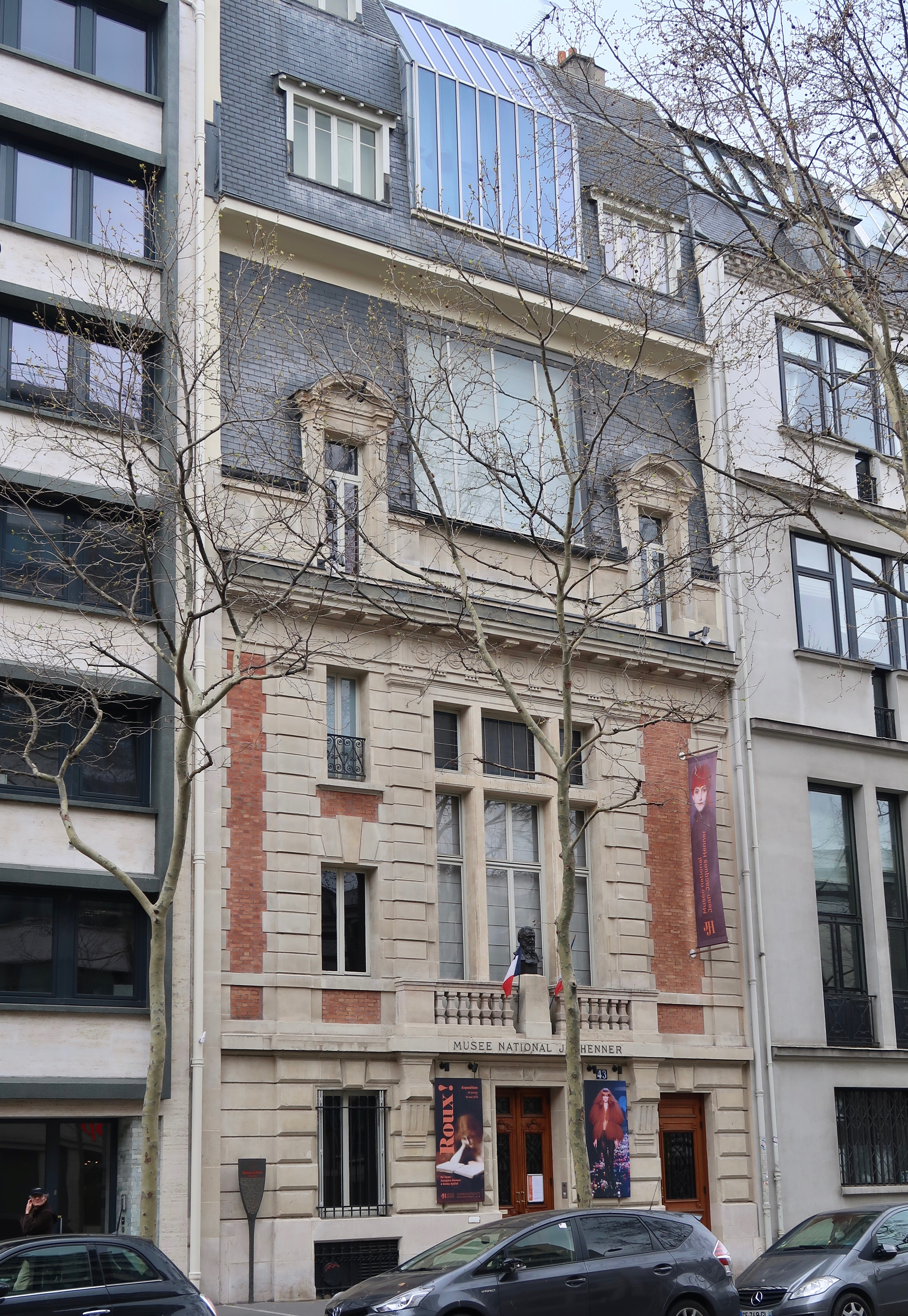
- Established: 7 March 1924
- Location: 43, Avenue de Villiers, Paris 17ème
- Founder: Marie (Mrs. Jules) Henner
- Website: www.musee-henner.fr

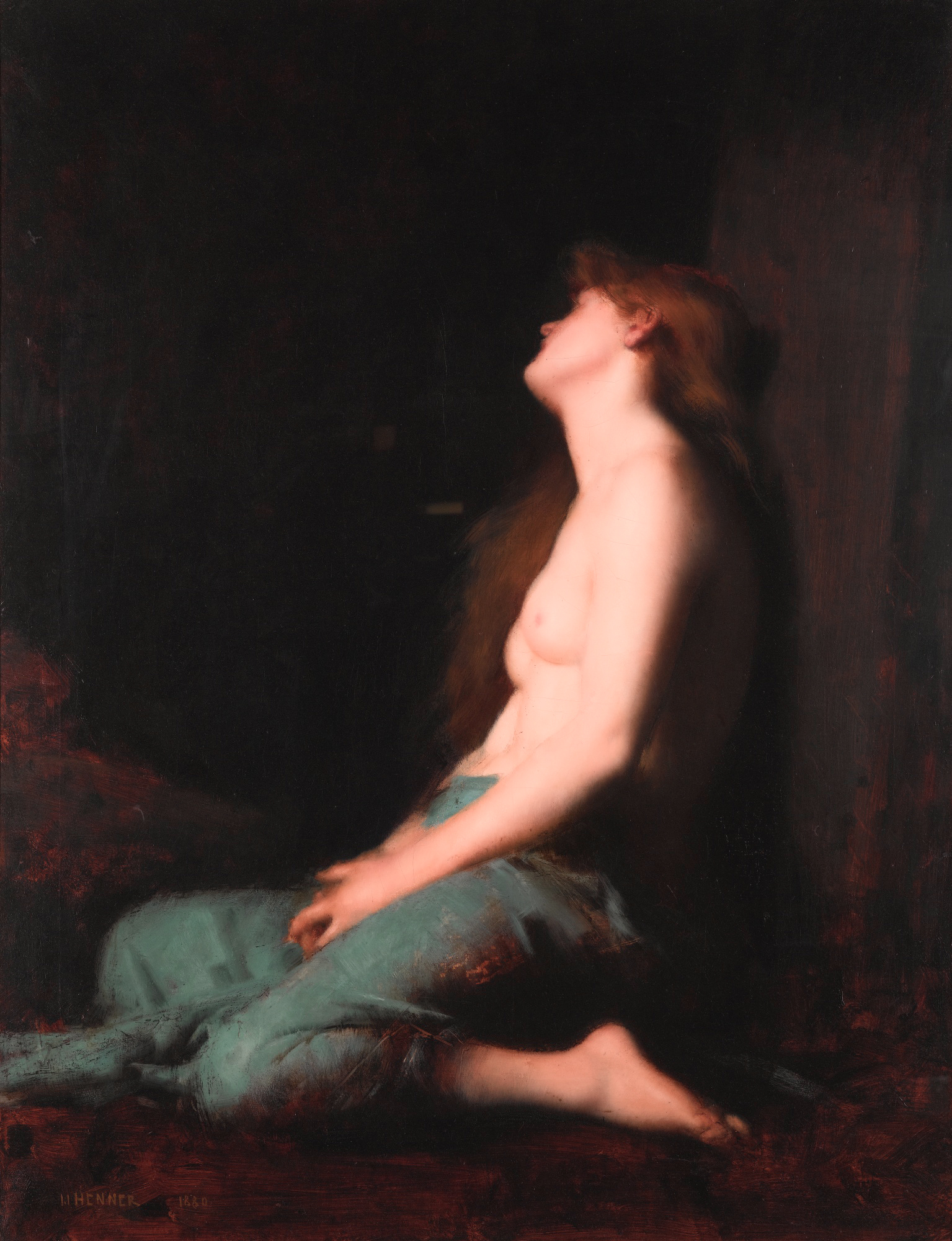
Henner's Solitude, c. 1881

The Musée national Jean-Jacques Henner is a French biographical art museum dedicated to the works of the painter Jean-Jacques Henner. It is located in the 17th arrondissement of Paris at 43, Avenue de Villiers.

== History and description ==
The museum is housed within an 1878 hôtel particulier designed by architect Nicolas-Félix Escalier. Following Henner's instructions, Marie Henner, the widow of his nephew Jules Henner, acquired it from the painter Guillaume Dubufe, in 1921. It was inaugurated as a museum on 7 March 1924 by Léon Bérard, Minister of Public Instruction. Its first director was Henner's former pupil Many Benner. It became a national museum in 1943.

The museum's holdings include a large collection of paintings and drawings by Alsatian painter Jean-Jacques Henner, as well as some 1,000 sketches, documents and souvenirs. A selection of these works and artifacts a displayed in seven rooms on four floors of exhibition space. The collection includes more than 130 portraits, as well as paintings of mythical themes and figures in dream landscapes that approach the work of the Symbolists.

Many preparatory studies are displayed alongside finished paintings, together with descriptions and evaluations by contemporary critics.

== Temporary exhibitions ==
- 7 November 2009 – 8 February 2010: "Francisco de Goya's La Tauromaquia"
- 2 June – 6 September 2010 : "Visions on Henner's art of drawing"
- 1 February – 2 July 2012: "From impression to dream: Henner's landscapes"
- 16 November 2012 – 16 September 2013: "Sensuality and spirituality. In search of the absolute"

== See also ==
- Alsace, She Waits
- Herodias
- La Liseuse
- Salome
- List of museums in Paris
- List of single-artist museums
