= Bernwiller =

Commune in Grand Est, France

- Commune
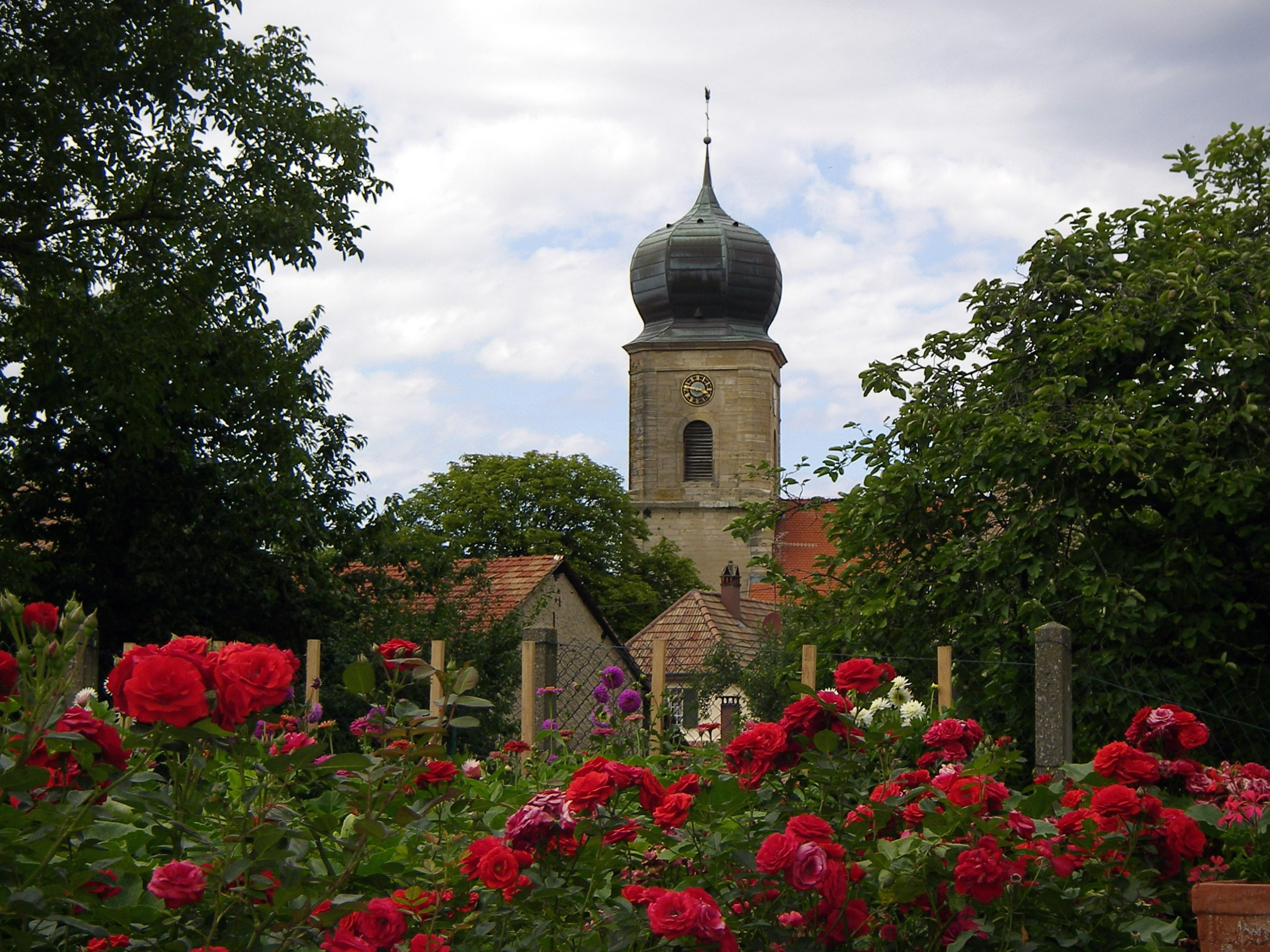
- The church in Bernwiller

- Coat of arms
- Location of Bernwiller
- Location within France Location within Grand Est
- Coordinates: 47°41′32″N 7°11′29″E
- Country: France
- Region: Grand Est
- Department: Haut-Rhin
- Arrondissement: Altkirch
- Canton: Masevaux-Niederbruck

Government
  - Mayor (2022–2026): Patrick Baur
- Area^{1}: 10.65 km^{2} (4.11 sq mi)
- Elevation: 283 m (928 ft)
- Highest elevation: 307 m (1,007 ft)
- Lowest elevation: 277 m (909 ft)
- Population (2023): 1,205
  - Density: 113.1/km^{2} (293.0/sq mi)
- Time zone: UTC+01:00 (CET)
  - Summer (DST): UTC+02:00 (CEST)
- INSEE/Postal code: 68006 /68210
- ^{1} French Land Register data, which excludes lakes, ponds, glaciers > 1 km^{2} (0.386 sq mi or 247 acres) and river estuaries.

Bernwiller (French pronunciation: [bɛʁnvilɛʁ]; German: Bernweiler; Alsatian: Barnwiller) is a commune in the Haut-Rhin department in north-eastern France. On 1 January 2016, the former commune Ammertzwiller was merged into Bernwiller.

== See also ==
- Communes of the Haut-Rhin department
