= Jean-Jacques Henner =

19th-century French painter (1829–1905)

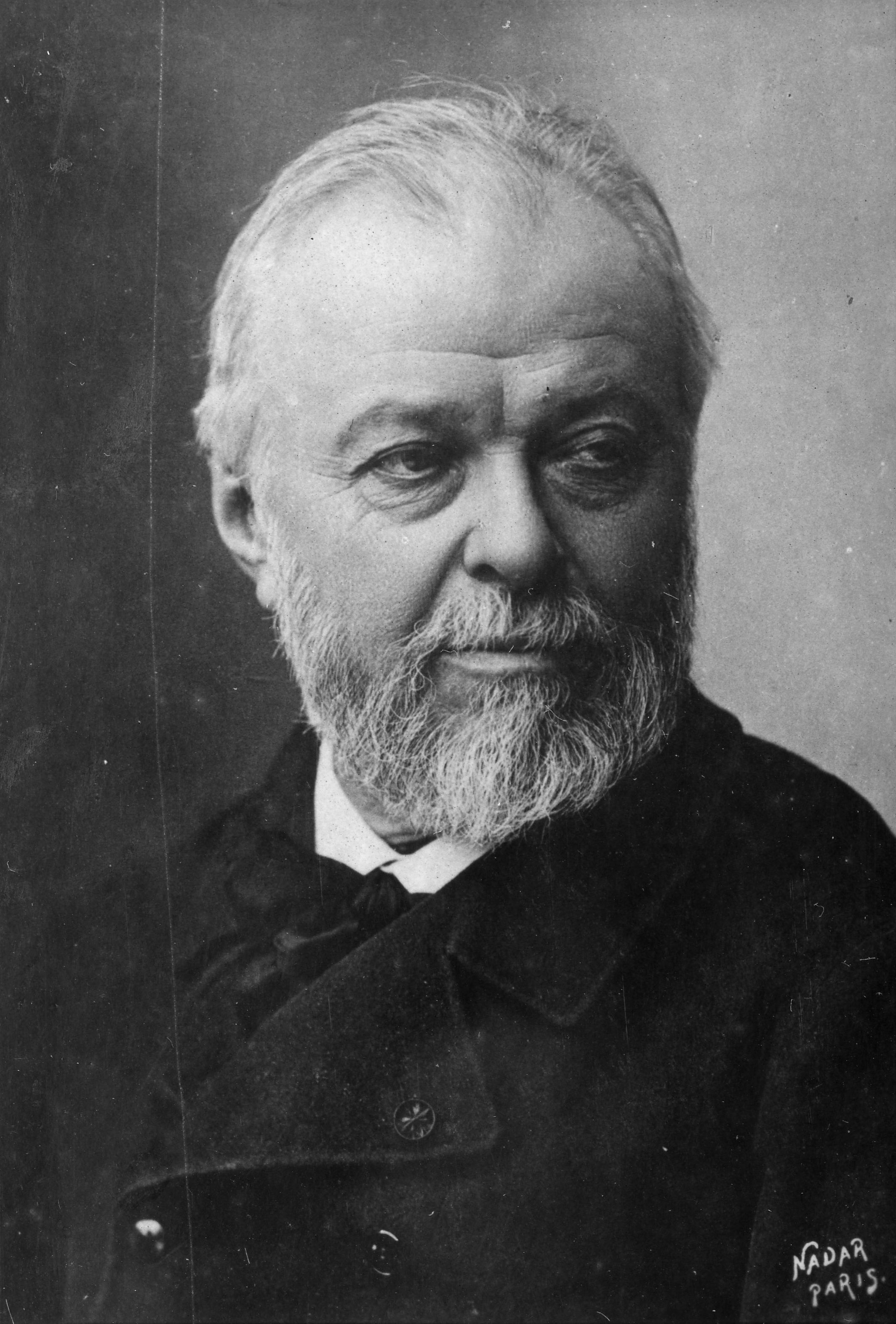
- Photograph by Nadar (c. 1900)
- Born: 5 March 1829; Bernwiller, Alsace
- Died: 23 July 1905 (aged 76); Paris, French Third Republic
- Occupation: Painter

Jean-Jacques Henner (5 March 1829 – 23 July 1905) was a French painter, noted for his use of sfumato and chiaroscuro in painting nudes, religious subjects and portraits.

== Biography ==
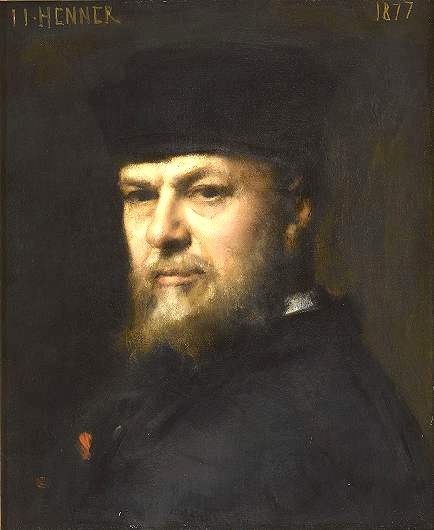
Self-portrait, 1877

Henner was born at Bernwiller (Alsace). He began his studies in art as a pupil of Michel Martin Drolling and François-Édouard Picot. In 1848, he entered the École des Beaux Arts in Paris, and took the Prix de Rome with a painting of Adam and Eve finding the Body of Abel in 1858. In Rome, he was guided by Flandrin, and painted four pictures for the gallery at Colmar among other works.

He first exhibited Bather Asleep at the Salon in 1863 and subsequently contributed Chaste Susanna (1865), now in the Musée d'Orsay. Other noted works include: Byblis turned into a Spring (1867); The Magdalene (1878); Portrait of M. Hayem (1878); Christ Entombed (1879); Saint Jerome (1881); Bara (1882); Herodias (1887); A Study (1891); Christ in His Shroud and a Portrait of Carolus-Duran (1896); a Portrait of Mlle Fouquier (1897); and The Dream (1900).

The Levite of the Tribe of Ephraim (1898) was awarded a first-class medal. Among other professional distinctions, Henner also took a Grand Prix for painting at the Paris Exposition Universelle of 1900. He was made Chevalier of the Legion of Honour in 1873, Officer in 1878, and Commander in 1889. In 1889, he succeeded Cabanel in the Institut de France. Henner's most widely known work is his 1885 painting of Saint Fabiola. Although the original is now lost, it was copied by artists around the world for devotional purposes. Artist Francis Alÿs has collected over 500 copies of the painting in a variety of media. The collection is known as the "Fabiola Project".

Henner died at age 76 in Paris.

== Pupils ==
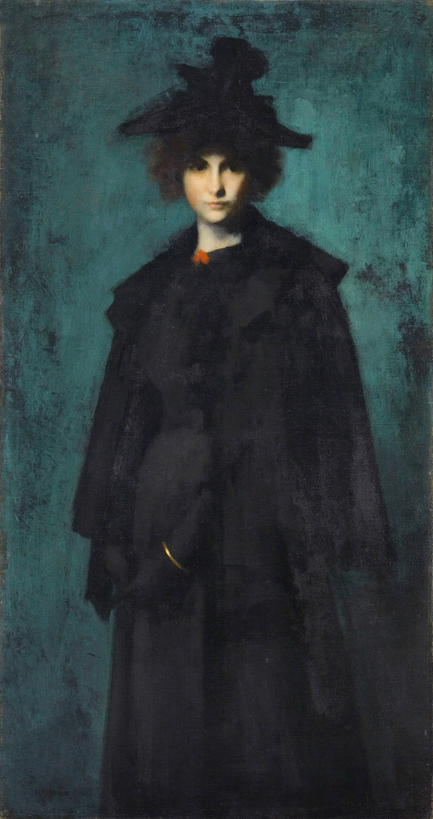
Henner's portrait of Laura Leroux, 1898, Musée d'Orsay, Paris.

Henner had numerous pupils; among them were the American painter Mathilde Mueden Leisenring and the Romanian artist Dimitrie Serafim. From 1874 to 1889 he taught at "the studio of the ladies", organized with Carolus-Duran, at a time when women were not allowed entry to the École des Beaux-Arts. Some of these students also served as his models. One of these was Dorothy Tennant, who later married Henry Morton Stanley. Another was Laura Leroux-Revault, daughter of his close friend Hector Leroux; Henner's full-length portrait of Laura Leroux now at the Musée d'Orsay was shown at the Paris Salon of 1898 and purchased by the French State.

Another pupil was Elizabeth Snowden Nichols Watrous (1858–1921), later the wife of artist Harry Watrous. Henner gave the couple a painting when they were married in 1887.

Suzanne Valadon (1865–1938) also worked as one of his models.

== Bibliography ==
- E Bricon, Psychologie d'art (Paris, 1900); C Phillips, Art Journal (1888)
- Frederick Wedmore, Magazine of Art (1888).
- Isabelle de Lannoy, Catalogue raisonne Jean-Jacques Henner 1829-1905 [2008]

== Gallery ==
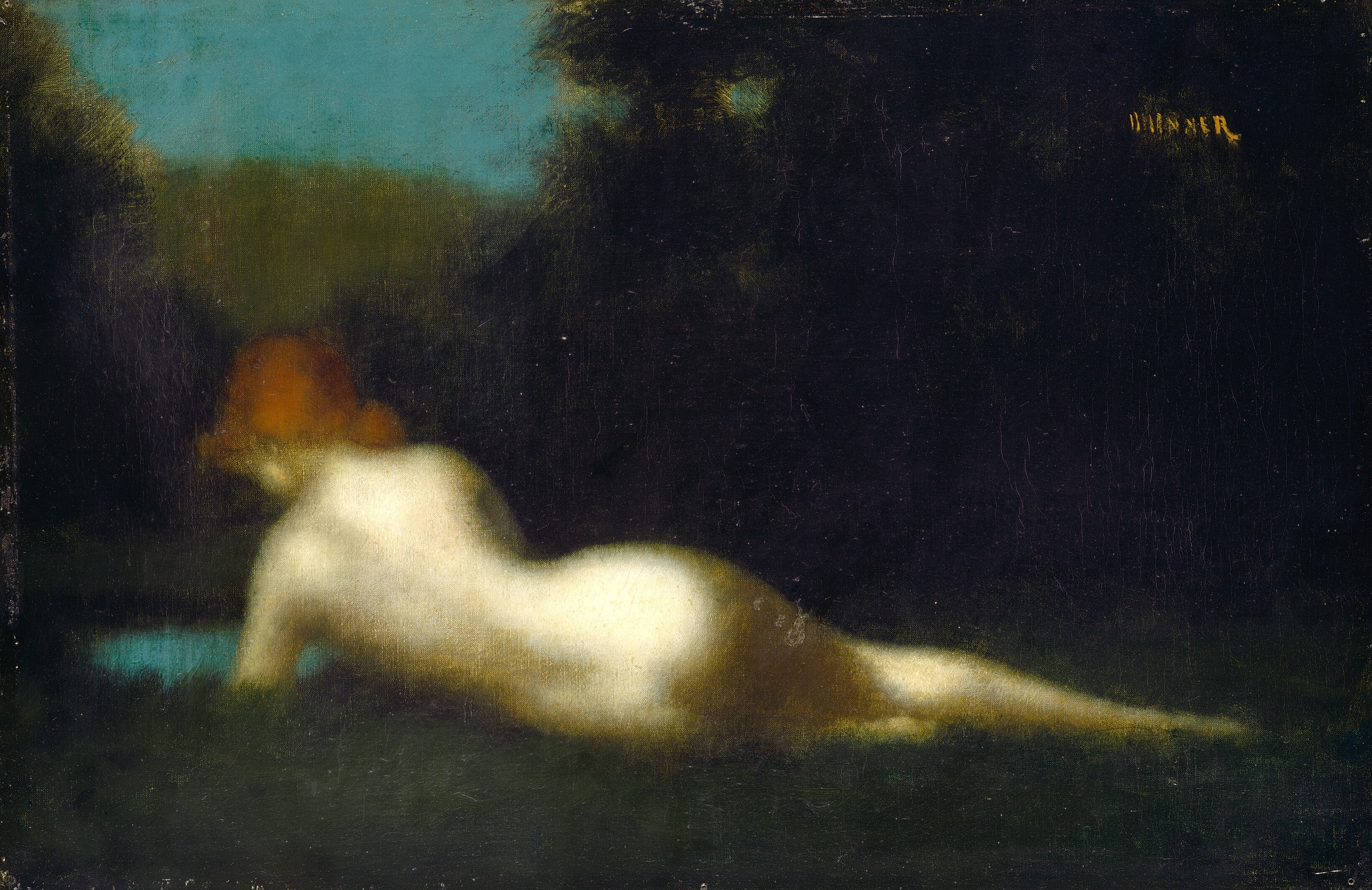
Reclining Nude,
National Gallery of Art, Washington, D.C.

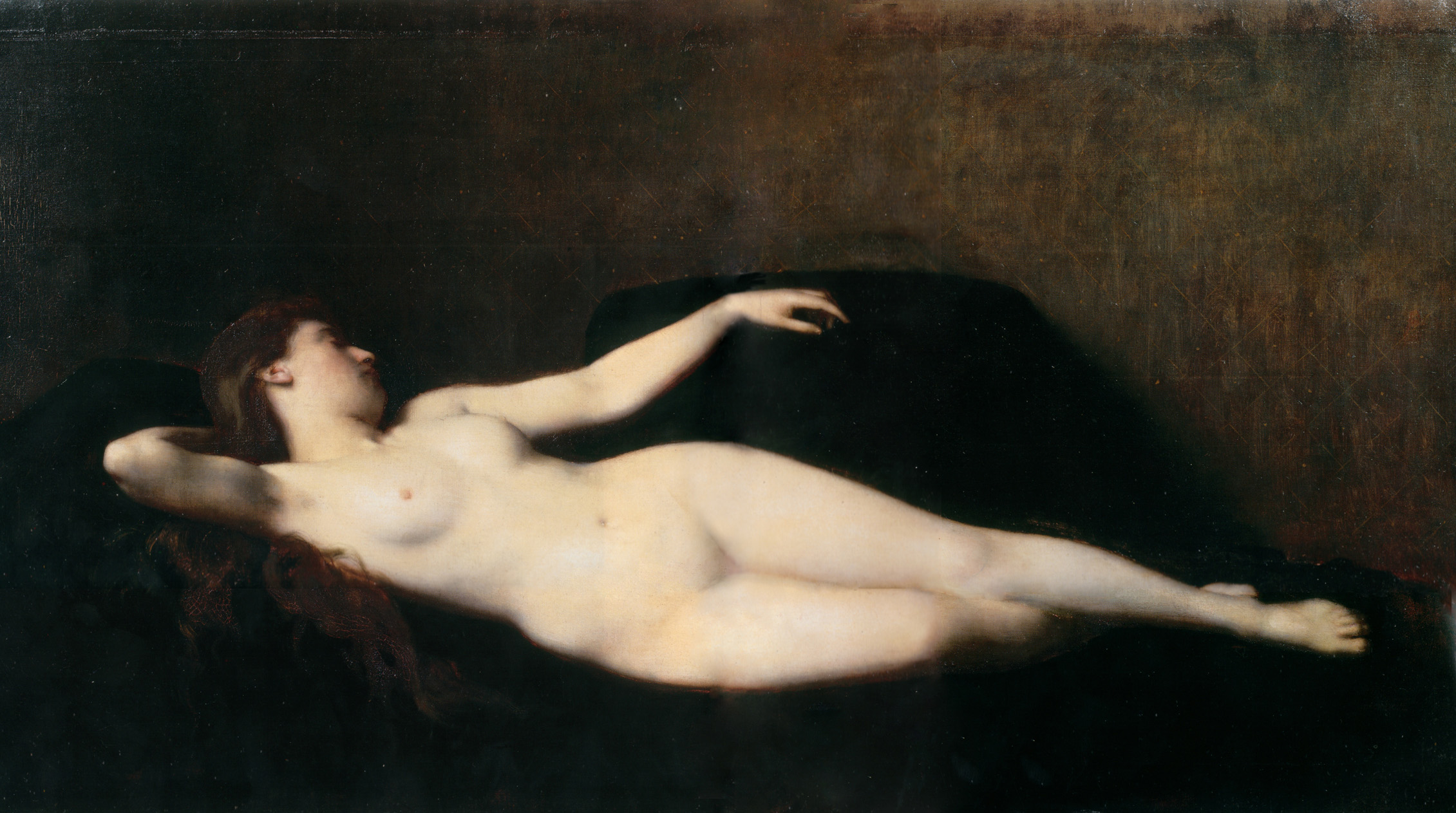
Woman on a Black Divan,
Musée des Beaux-Arts, Mulhouse

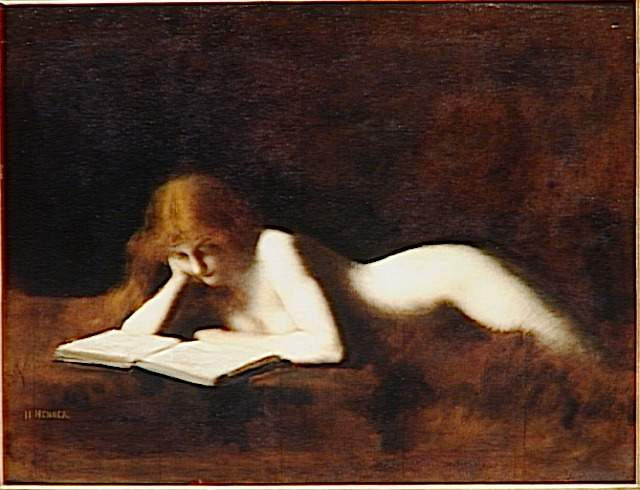
La liseuse,
Musée d'Orsay,
Paris

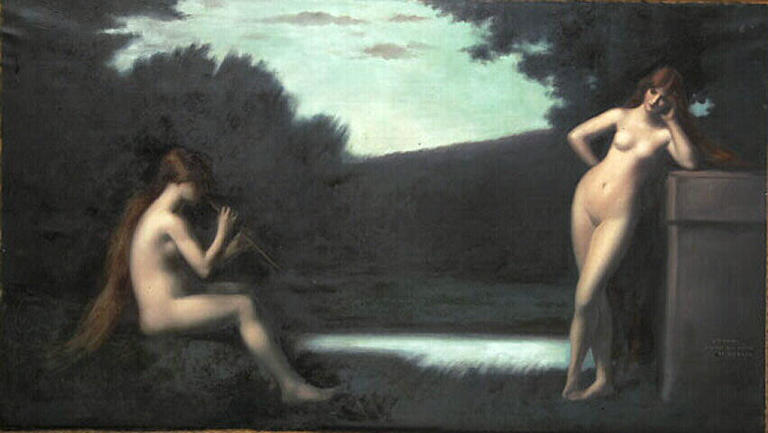
Nus féminins
Musée d'Orsay,
Paris

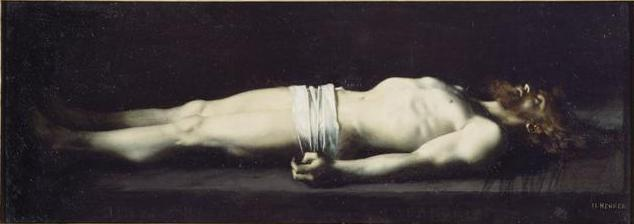
Jésus au tombeau
Musée d'Orsay,
Paris

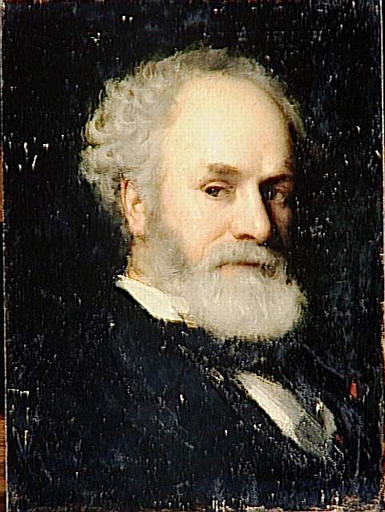
Jules Janssen
Musée d'Orsay,
Paris

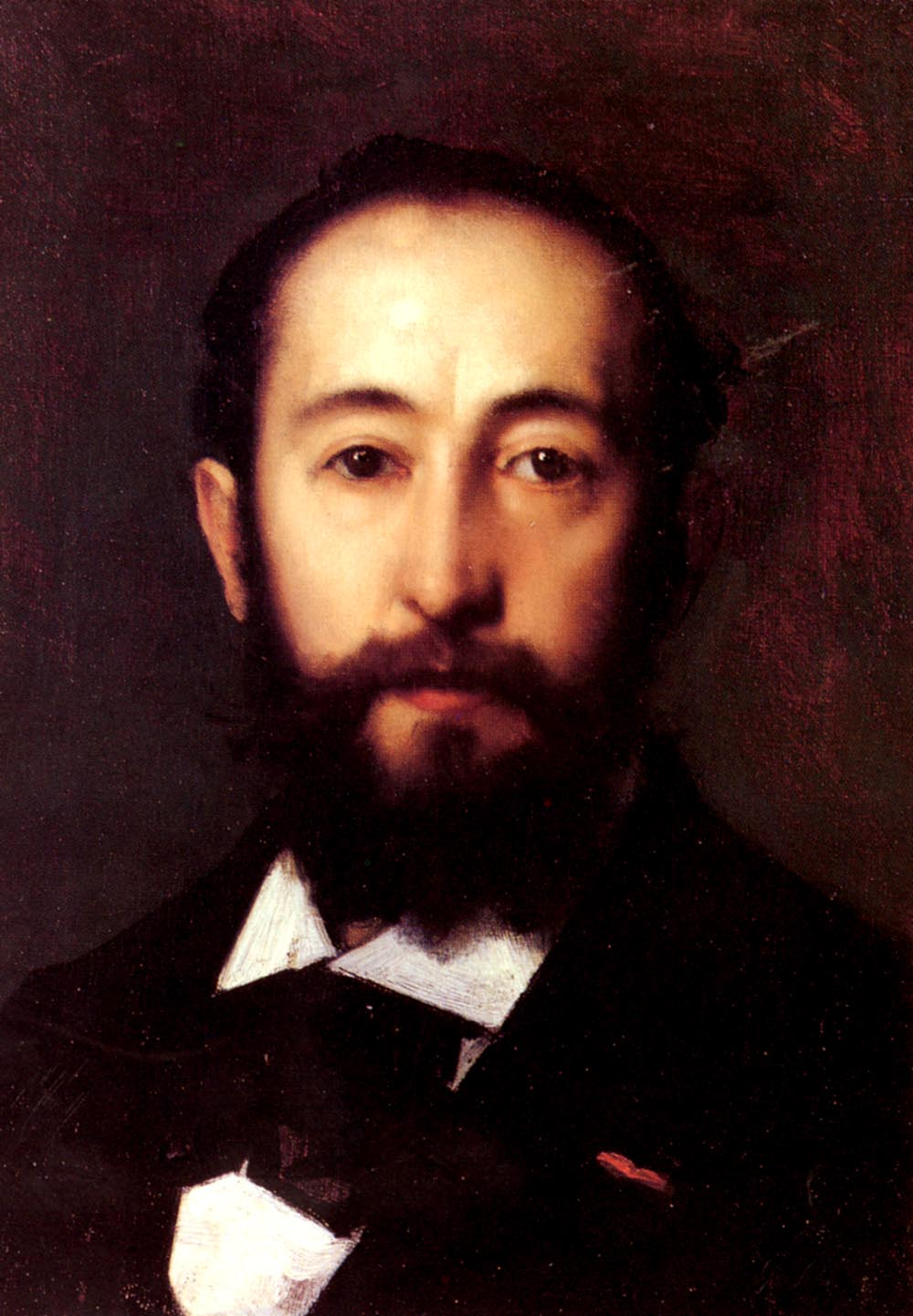
Portrait d'homme
Musée d'Orsay,
Paris

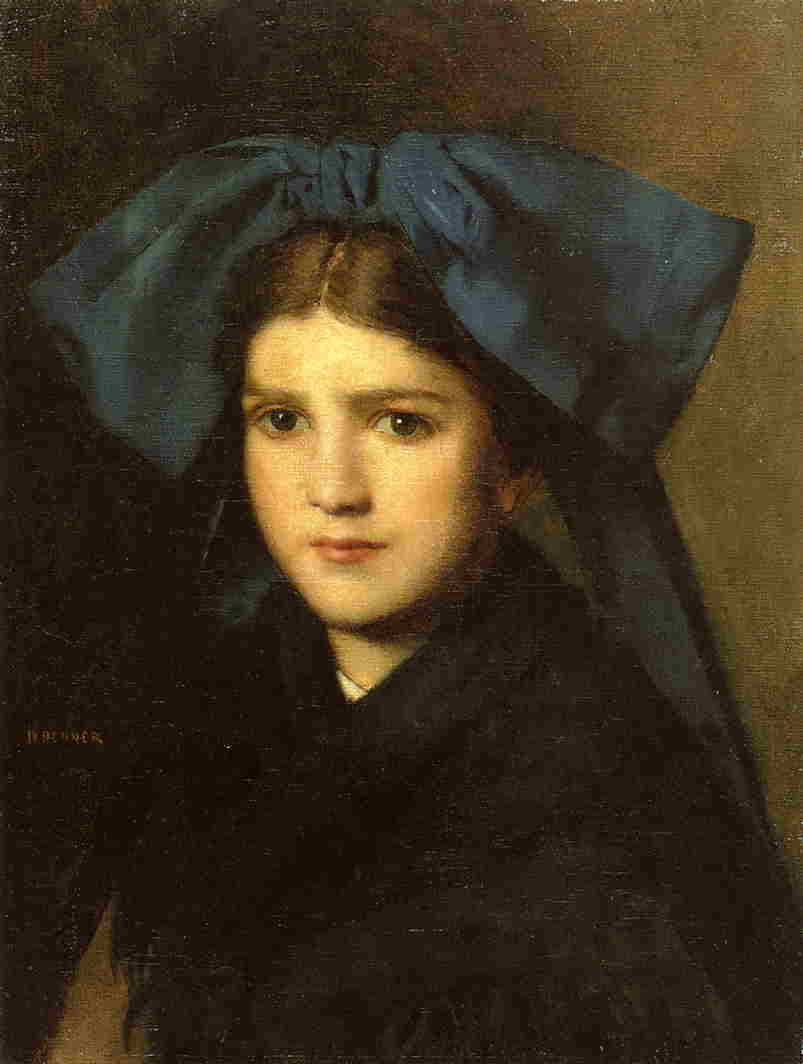
Portrait of a Young Girl with a Bow in Her Hair, private collection

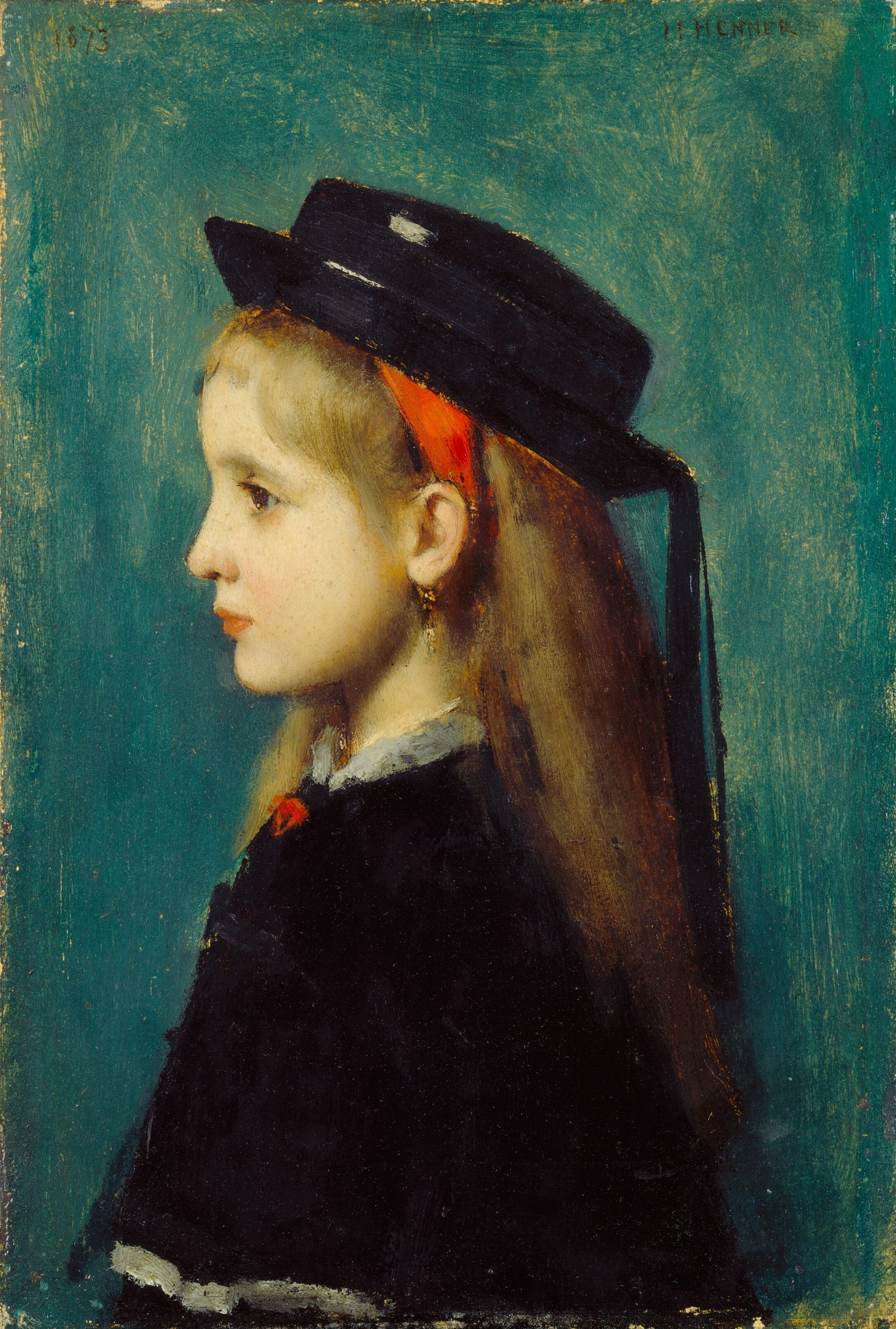
Alsatian Girl,
National Gallery of Art, Washington, D.C.

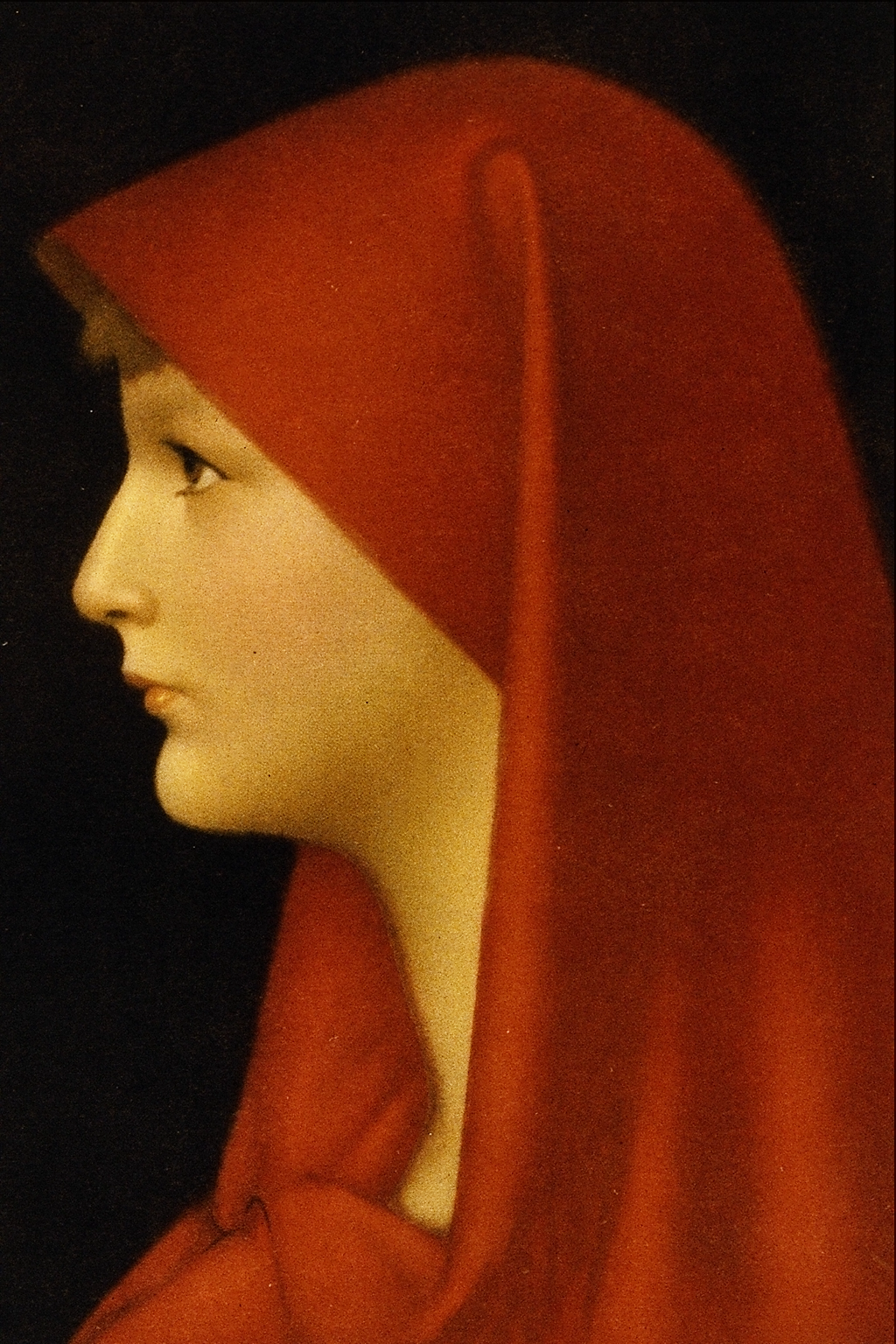
Saint Fabiola
copy of lost original

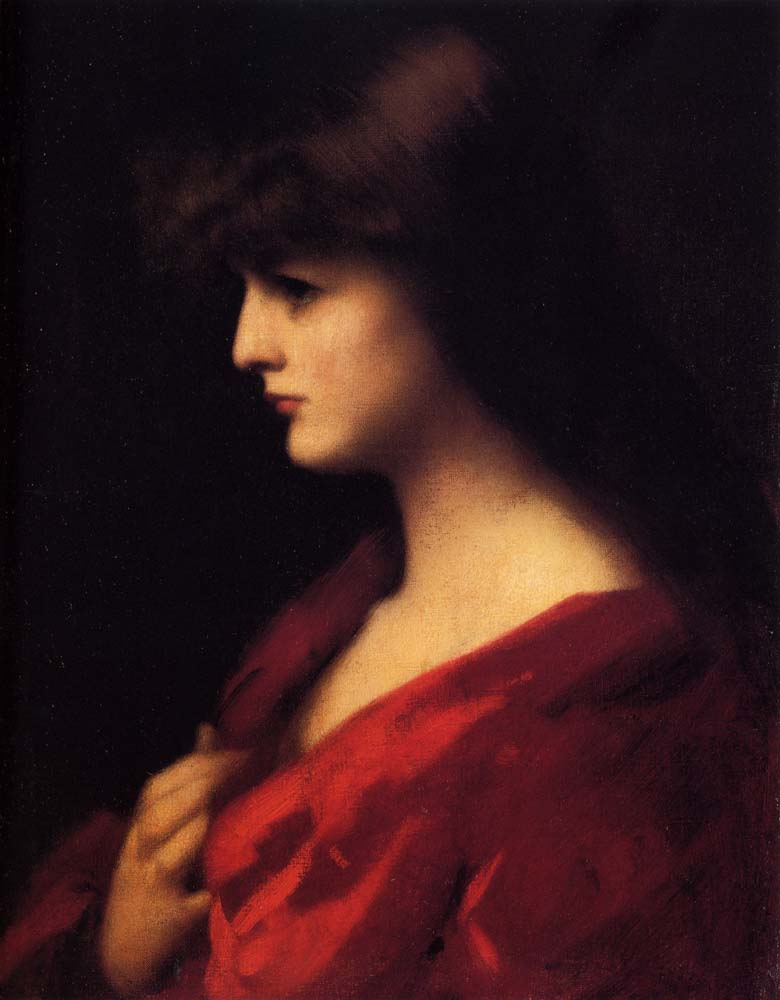
Study of a Woman in Red, The Hermitage,
St. Petersburg, Russia

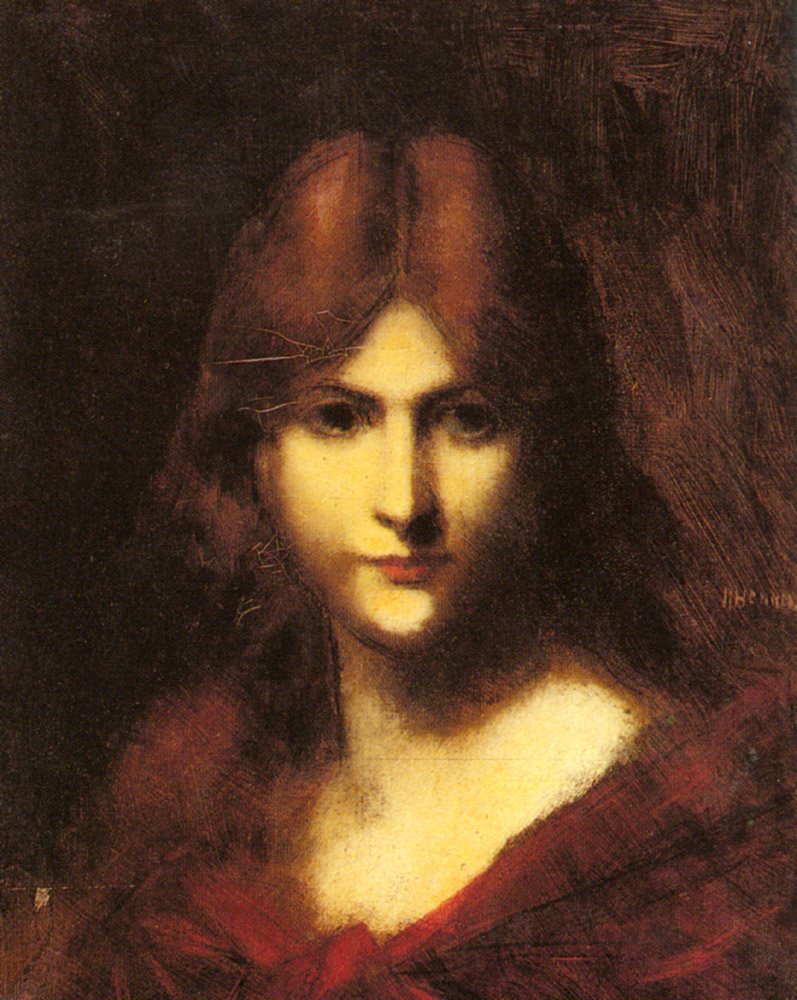
A Red-Haired Beauty,
private collection

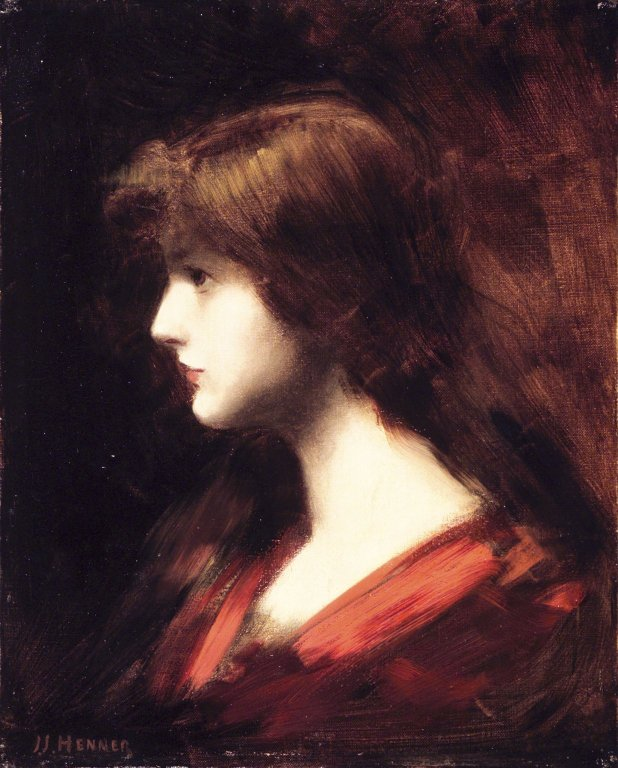
Head of a Girl - Brooklyn Museum

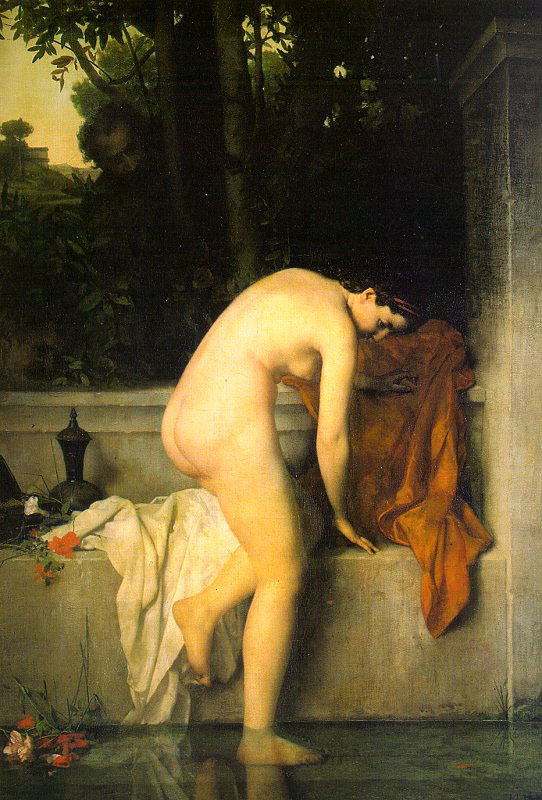
The Chaste Susannah
Musée d'Orsay,
Paris

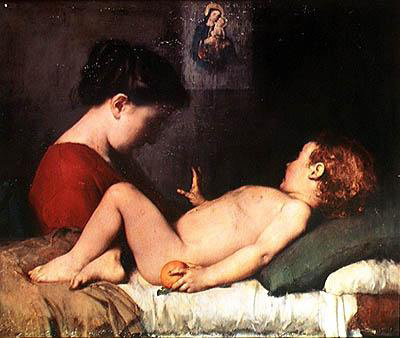
Le réveil de l'enfant
Musée des Beaux-Arts, Dijon

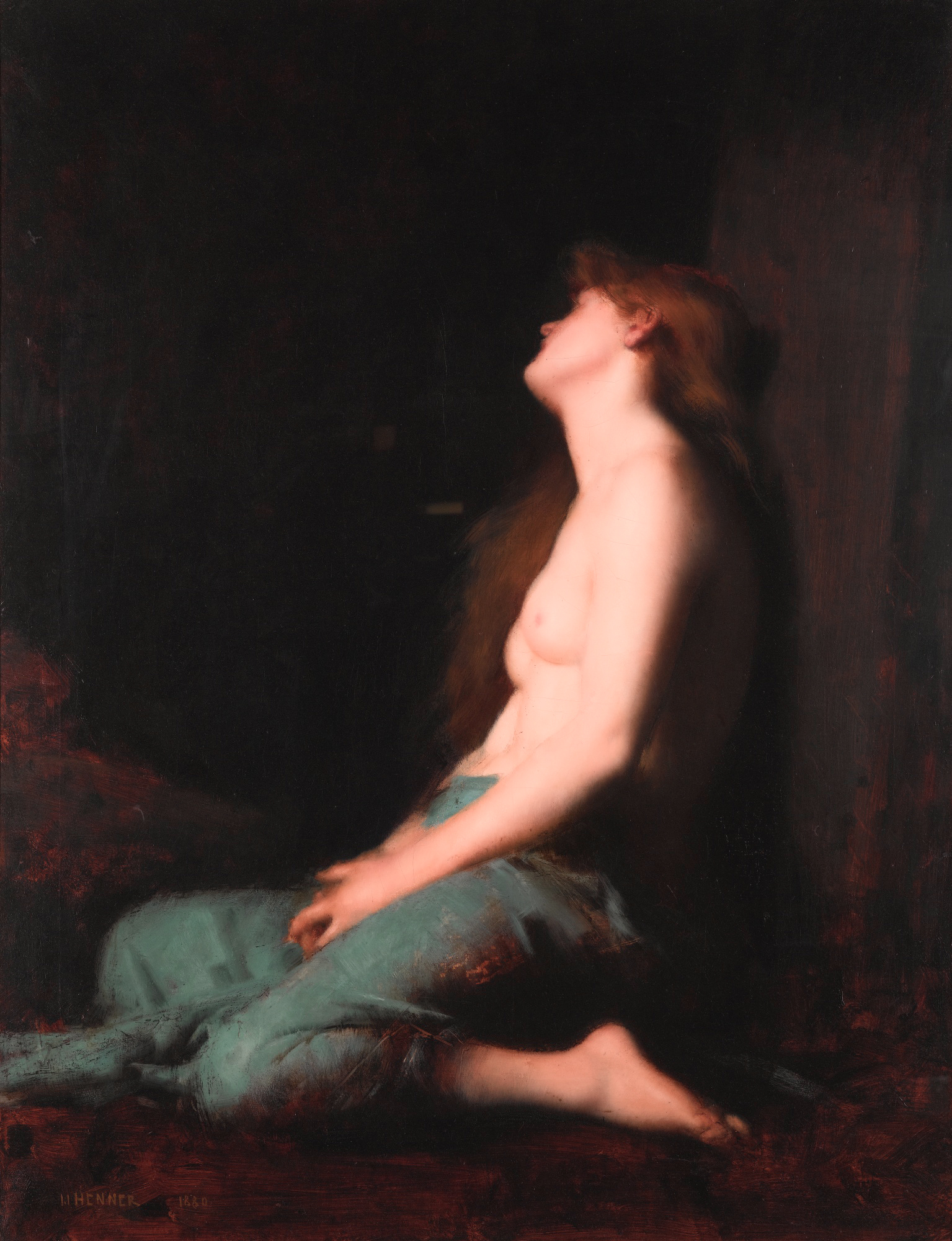
Penitent Magdalene,
private collection - Cantor Arts Center, Stanford, California

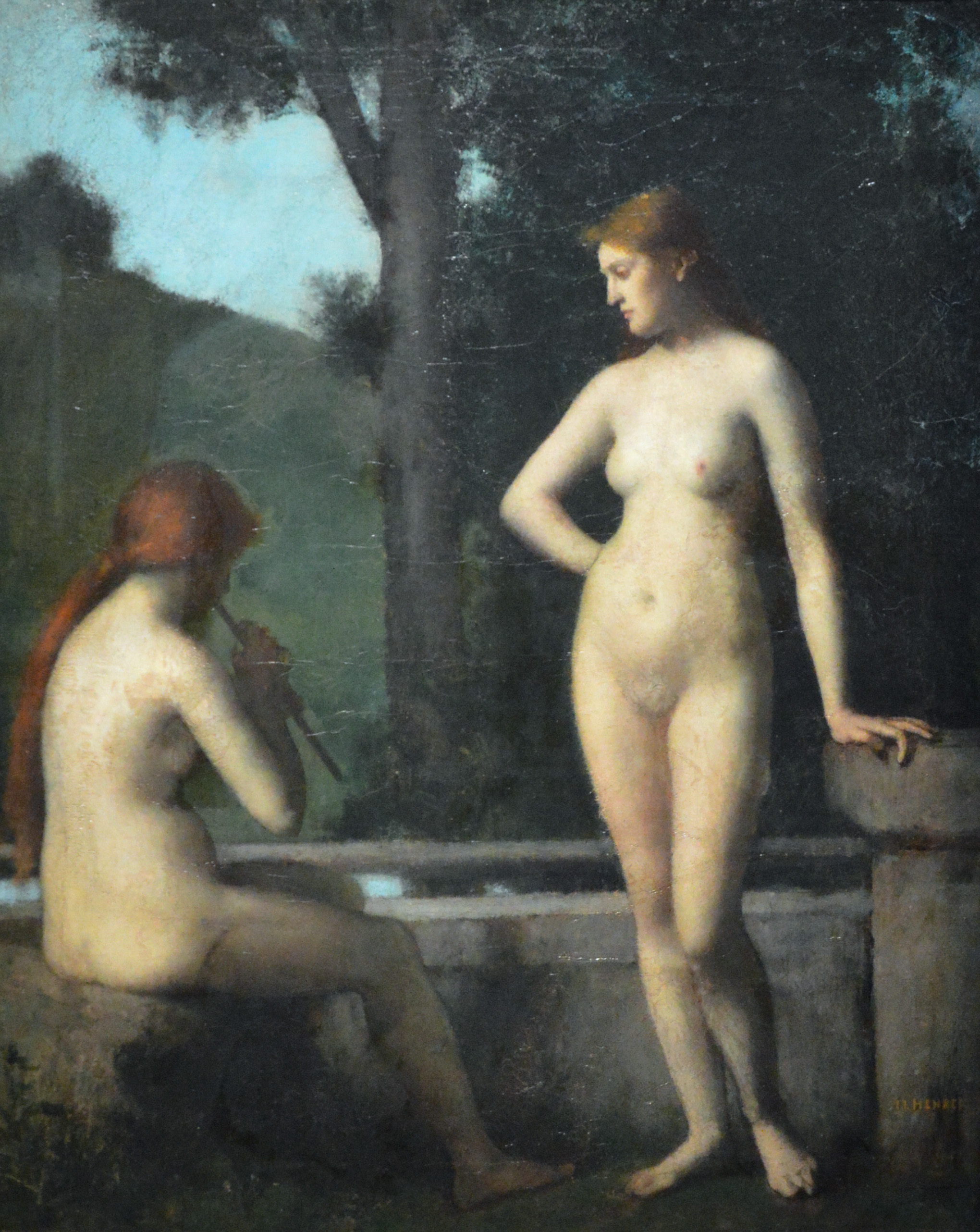
Idylle
Musée d'Orsay,
Paris

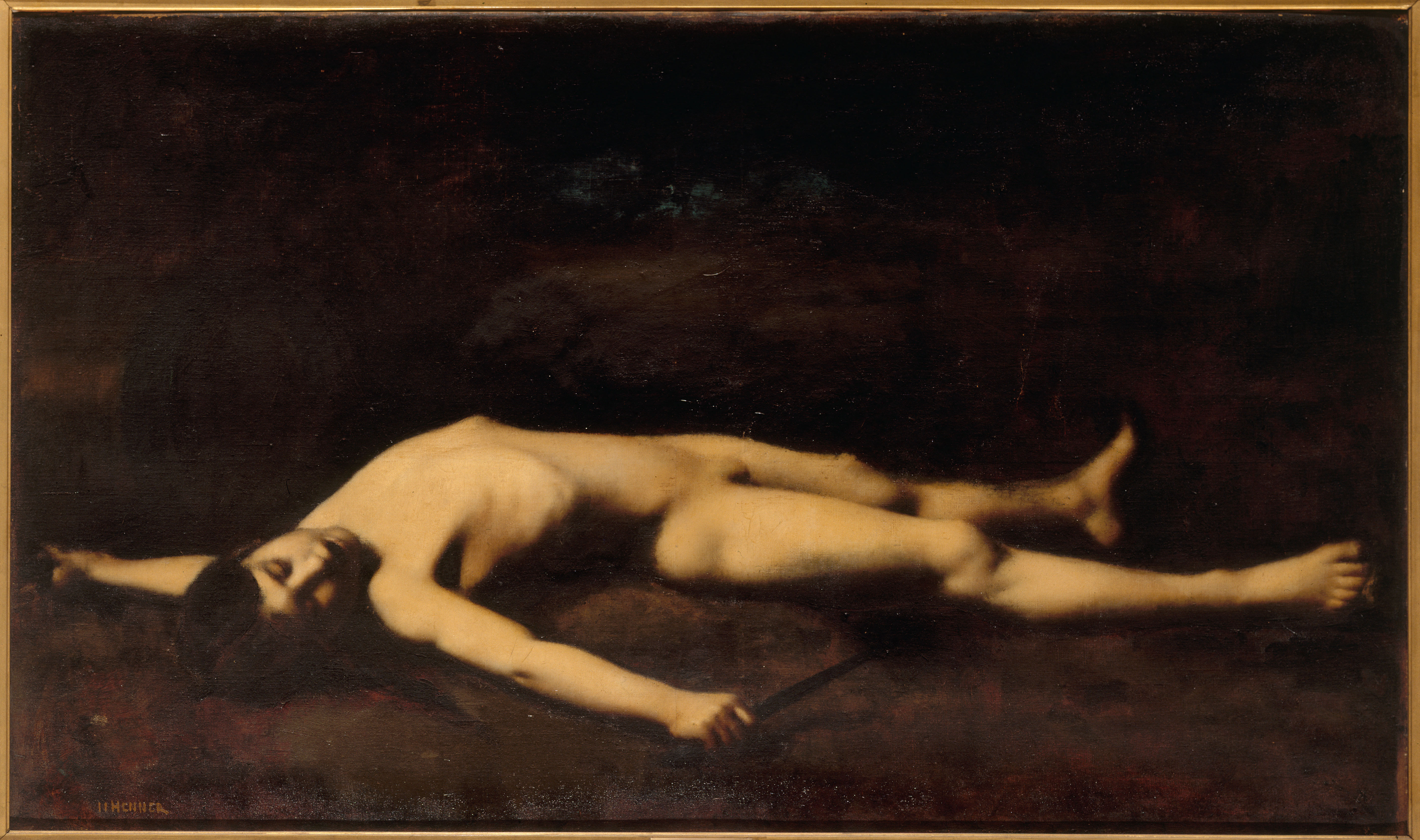
Bara
Petit Palais,
Paris

== See also ==
- Musée national Jean-Jacques Henner
