= Musée historique =

Musée historique may refer to:

- Musée historique de Strasbourg
- Musée historique de Mulhouse
- Musée historique de Haguenau
