= Territorial evolution of France =

Dynamic map of the European frontiers of France from 985 to 1947

This article describes the process by which metropolitan France - that part of France that is located in Europe, excluding its various overseas territories - came to consist of the territory it does today. Its current borders date from 1947.

Modern France is the successor state to the Kingdom of France, itself a successor to the Kingdom of West Francia, which came into being in 843 when the empire of Charlemagne was divided. Its rulers styled themselves as "King of the Franks", and their realm continued to be known as Francia, until king Philip II became the first to refer to himself as "King of France", in 1204.

Although in theory the medieval kingdom of France was not much smaller than the modern French Republic - stretching from the North Sea to the Mediterranean, and from the Atlantic Ocean to the Alps - the reality was that the king's direct authority was limited to a small area around Paris known as the île de France. The rest of the kingdom was made up of numerous all but independent fiefs ruled by the king's vassals: dukes and counts who owed him their loyalty and allegiance. To what extent areas like the County of Toulouse or the Duchy of Aquitaine can be considered part of the Kingdom of France before they were conquered by the king's armies is debatable. An integral part of the Kingdom of France's evolution through the Middle Ages is the story of how the Capetian kings, and their successors the Valois, brought these areas already in the kingdom under direct royal control, either through conquest, purchase or inheritance. Meanwhile, the acquisitions of the counties of Dauphine in 1349, and Provence in 1486, saw at once both the Royal Domain and the Kingdom of France expand their frontiers into the south-east, with both having previously been fiefs of the neighbouring Holy Roman Empire.

In 1066 Duke William of Normandy conquered England, making him and his successors simultaneously kings of England and - technically at least - vassals of the king of France. However, their loyalty and obedience to him was hardly a likely prospect, and the attempts of English kings to both directly control and expand their French territories sparked a succession of wars during the Late Middle Ages. On the one hand, the cost of defeat in battle could have calamitous consequences, and leave even more territory in English hands. But on the other, these wars served to unite the French feudal lords against a common enemy, and the king could use their military assistance to help conquer territory on behalf of the crown. Moreover, the wars with England - in particular the Hundred Years' War, from which France ultimately emerged victorious in 1453 - helped forge a sense of French national identity.

At the beginning of the Early Modern Period, the final feudal lordships were absorbed into the royal domain, along with the large duchies of Brittany and Burgundy. By now France had become a much more centralised state, with its king exercising absolute power. Although attempts at expanding into the Italian Peninsula and the Low Countries at the expense of the increasingly powerful Habsburg dynasty were ultimately unsuccessful, France's victory in the Thirty Years' War over Habsburg Spain and Austria cemented its position as the foremost power on the European continent. There followed a series of annexations during the reign of Louis XIV that greatly expanded the Kingdom of France in the north and in the east, such as Artois in 1659, Alsace in 1675, and Franche-Comté in 1678. However, only a small part of the wealthy County of Flanders, lost to the Habsburgs in 1493, was regained in 1668.

The Duchy of Lorraine remained some time an enclave in the French kingdom before it too was incorporated in 1766. But for a few smaller enclaves, this brought the territory of the kingdom into a consolidated block, known today as "l'Hexagone". Meanwhile, the island of Corsica, a long-time possession of the Republic of Genoa and briefly an independent republic, was conquered in 1768.

Following the French Revolution, the new republic annexed the last remaining exclaves surrounded by France, such as the papal territory of Avignon, and conquered the former Austrian Netherlands (modern day Belgium) and Luxembourg. Faced with war against virtually all the other nations in Europe, France reached by far its greatest territorial extent during the early nineteenth century when the Emperor Napoleon incorporated the Dutch Republic, Catalonia, Dalmatia, and parts of Germany and Italy into the First French Empire. However following Napoleon's final defeat at Waterloo in 1815, France's borders were returned to where they had been in 1791 (but for the small enclaves annexed by the republic).

Since then, France has been invaded by Prussia and twice by Germany, but has regained any lost territories on each occasion (Alsace and Lorraine changing hands four times in the process). Thus the territory of the Metropolitan France that emerged from the aftermath of World War II almost exactly corresponded with that of France on the eve of the revolution.

Although Algeria was designated a department of France in 1848, and remained so until its independence in 1962, it is not counted as part of Metropolitan France for the purposes of this article.

== Geographical context ==
To a large extent, modern France lies within clear limits of physical geography. Roughly half of its margin lies on sea coasts: one continuous coastline along "La Manche" ("the sleeve" or English Channel) and the Atlantic Ocean forming the country's north-western and western edge, and a shorter, separate coastline along the Mediterranean Sea forming its south-eastern edge.

In the south-west, France's border with Spain and Andorra runs along the peaks of the Pyrenees mountain range, a border which has barely changed since the Middle Ages (and not changed at all since the 1659 Treaty of the Pyrenees). In the south-east, its border with Italy and Switzerland today runs through mostly through the Alps, though this border has undergone several minor alterations over recent centuries, most recently in the aftermath of World War II.

It is in the East and north-East that France's borders are both less defined by physical geography and have undergone the most significant changes since the Medieval period. After the consolidation of French territories on the left bank of the River Rhine in the seventeenth century, and the incorporation of Franche-Comte (previously ruled by Spain) and the Duchy of Lorraine (previously independent) in the eighteenth century, the border has followed one or another of the Jura ranges until it reaches the Rhine, which it follows downstream. The remaining section, between the Rhine and the North Sea, has the least clear natural definition.

== Middle Ages (843–1453) ==
=== West Francia and the Carolingian kings ===
Partition of the Frankish Empire after the Treaty of Verdun 843. West Francia Middle Francia East Francia

The division of the Carolingian Empire into West, Middle and East Francia at the Treaty of Verdun in 843 - with three grandsons of the emperor Charlemagne installed as their kings - was regarded at the time as a temporary arrangement, yet it heralded the birth of what would later become France and Germany.

The first king of West Francia was Charles the Bald. The frontiers of his kingdom extended slightly further north and south than modern France, incorporating what is now Luxembourg and parts of Belgium, and the county of Barcelona (Catalonia). However, they did not extend as far east, with areas such as Lorraine, Alsace and Provence forming part of Middle Francia. The former kingdom of Burgundy was split in two, with West Francia receiving the Duchy of Burgundy and Middle Francia receiving the County of Burgundy (the two Burgundys would sit on each side of this border until 1678). Meanwhile, Brittany was an independent kingdom. While Charles's realm comprised the Frankish heartland - where the term "Frankish" would gradually evolve into "French" - the lands to the east of the Rhine comprising East Francia were inhabited mostly by Germanic and Slavic peoples.

However, the Carolingian dynasty was on shaky ground from the very start. Middle Francia broke apart almost immediately, its territory gradually incorporated into its Western and Eastern neighbours, while the West and East Frankish kings struggled to hold their realms together in the face of continual Viking raids and rebellious local lords. The Duke of Saxony, Henry the Fowler, became the first Germanic monarch in the east in 919, and his son Otto the Great went on to use Charlemagne's title of Holy Roman Emperor. In West Francia, the last Carolingian king was deposed in 987 by Hugh Capet, who founded the Capetian dynasty, though he continued to style himself "King of the Franks".

For the next 800 years, both the Holy Roman Emperors and the Kings of the Franks/Kings of France would regard themselves as the true successor to Charlemagne. The Germanic monarchy may have adopted the grander of Charlemagne's titles, but they were never able to consolidate their power enough to create a single, centralised state, and the Holy Roman Empire would remain a loose confederation of kingdoms, duchies, principalities and bishoprics throughout its history. The West Frankish (later French) monarchy, on the other hand, would start from a very modest power base, grow its authority very gradually over many centuries, and eventually establish itself as one of the foremost powers in Western Europe.

West Francia at the ascension of king Hugh Capet in 987

Like its eastern neighbour, Hugh Capet's kingdom was incredibly decentralised, with his personal authority barely felt in those lands furthest from Paris, the city he made his capital. In areas like Brittany and Aquitaine, the local populations had relied on their local lord to raise armies to resist the Vikings, and as the power and wealth of these lords had grown, they had successfully founded their own dynasties that would go on to challenge the authority of the king. Much closer to the capital, meanwhile, was the Duchy of Normandy ("land of the Norsemen"), an all but independent Viking state. It had been founded in 911 when king Charles the Simple granted the land to Rollo in exchange for he and his men converting to Christianity, and promising not to raid any further up the river Seine. Although Rollo's descendants gradually adopted Frankish religion, culture and language, Normandy would remain a thorn in the King of France's side for more than 500 years.

On the other side of the kingdom, the threat was not from Vikings, but from the Umayyads, the Muslim rulers of Al-Andalus (Spain). During the ninth and tenth century the Counts of Barcelona succeeded in driving the Umayyads further south, and established new Catalan counties in the newly conquered lands. The last count of Barcelona appointed by a Frankish king, Wilfred the Hairy, left these counties to his children, thereby establishing his own Catalan dynasty. When a Muslim army burned the city of Barcelona in 985, Count Borrell II sought refuge in the Montserrat mountains and waited for help from the Frankish king, which never arrived, causing the Catalans great resentment towards the Franks. Hugh Capet became king two years later, and there is no evidence to suggest that Borrell ever swore allegiance to him, effectively ending whatever semblance of Frankish authority over Catalonia was left. By the time the king of France formally renounced his historical claim to the County of Barcelona in the Treaty of Corbeil in 1258, it had already been in a personal union with the Kingdom of Aragon for over a century.

=== Struggles against the Plantagenets and Capetian expansion ===
The collection of territories that constituted the personal possession of the king, and over which he ruled directly, was known as the Crown lands or the "Royal domain". The process of assimilating the patchwork of feudal lands that made up the rest of the Kingdom of France into this domain would be very gradual, taking many centuries. For the early Capetian kings, the immediate obstacle was their domain's very limited size.

Until the reign of Philip II (1180–1222), the Royal Domain constituted one of the smallest fiefdoms in France, most of it consisting of the area around Paris (known as the île de France) and Orleans. Because it was from only these lands that the king could collect taxes or raise an army, he simply did not possess the military or financial means to expand the royal domain through conquest. However, under feudal law, if a king was at war his vassals were obliged to raise their own armies to fight alongside the king. Furthermore, the king had the power to introduce a special tax at times of war - the taille - which applied to all laypeople across the entire kingdom. Thus a successful military campaign could extend his personal authority over his kingdom, and potentially expand the royal domain. Moreover, a war with a foreign power would not necessarily be required, since feudal law gave the king of France the right to confiscate fiefs from vassals who were disobedient or disloyal, and he could potentially request military assistance from his other vassals to enforce this.

As it turned out, the perfect opportunity for the Capetians came in the shape of a foreign power who was simultaneously a disobedient vassal: the King of England. Following the conquest of England by William, Duke of Normandy in 1066, all subsequent English kings were now also vassals to the king of France and, in theory, owed him their loyalty and allegiance. In practice, of course, the kings on each side of the English Channel were almost never in allegiance with one another, and William the Conqueror's Norman and Plantagenet descendants increasingly came to regard Normandy as an extension of their own realm, a land loyal to only one king.

Kingdom of France in 1154, with the Angevin Empire in shades of red. The French royal domain is in darkest blue

The English and French kings' mutual rivalry intensified as more and more lands on the French side of the channel came under the king of England's rule, most notably Anjou and Aquitaine in 1154. Geoffrey Plantagenet was already Count of Anjou and the ruler of neighbouring Maine and Touraine when he married Empress Matilda, granddaughter of William the Conqueror and claimant to the throne of England. Geoffrey and Matilda's son then went on to marry the richest heiress in Europe and ex-wife of the king of France, Eleanor of Aquitaine. By the time he became king Henry II of England in 1154, he ruled over an empire stretching from the Scottish borders to the Pyrenees, and held more lands in the Kingdom of France than the king of France himself.

Fortunately for the kings of France, there was dissent at the heart of the Plantagenet family. Henry II attempted to control his empire by granting different parts of it to each of his sons, but this served to make them both hungry for power and capable of mounting rebellions. Henry, Richard and John - along with their mother, Eleanor of Aquitaine - each rebelled and raised armies against their father at various times during his reign. Once King John had inherited the empire in 1199, he caused confusion among his barons by his irregular and violent behaviour, which culminated in their collective rebellion and a civil war.

Philip II was able to take advantage of this by first capturing the fortress of the Château Gaillard downstream from Paris, and then conquering the Duchy of Normandy which - along with Touraine and Anjou - he formally confiscated from king John of England in 1204.

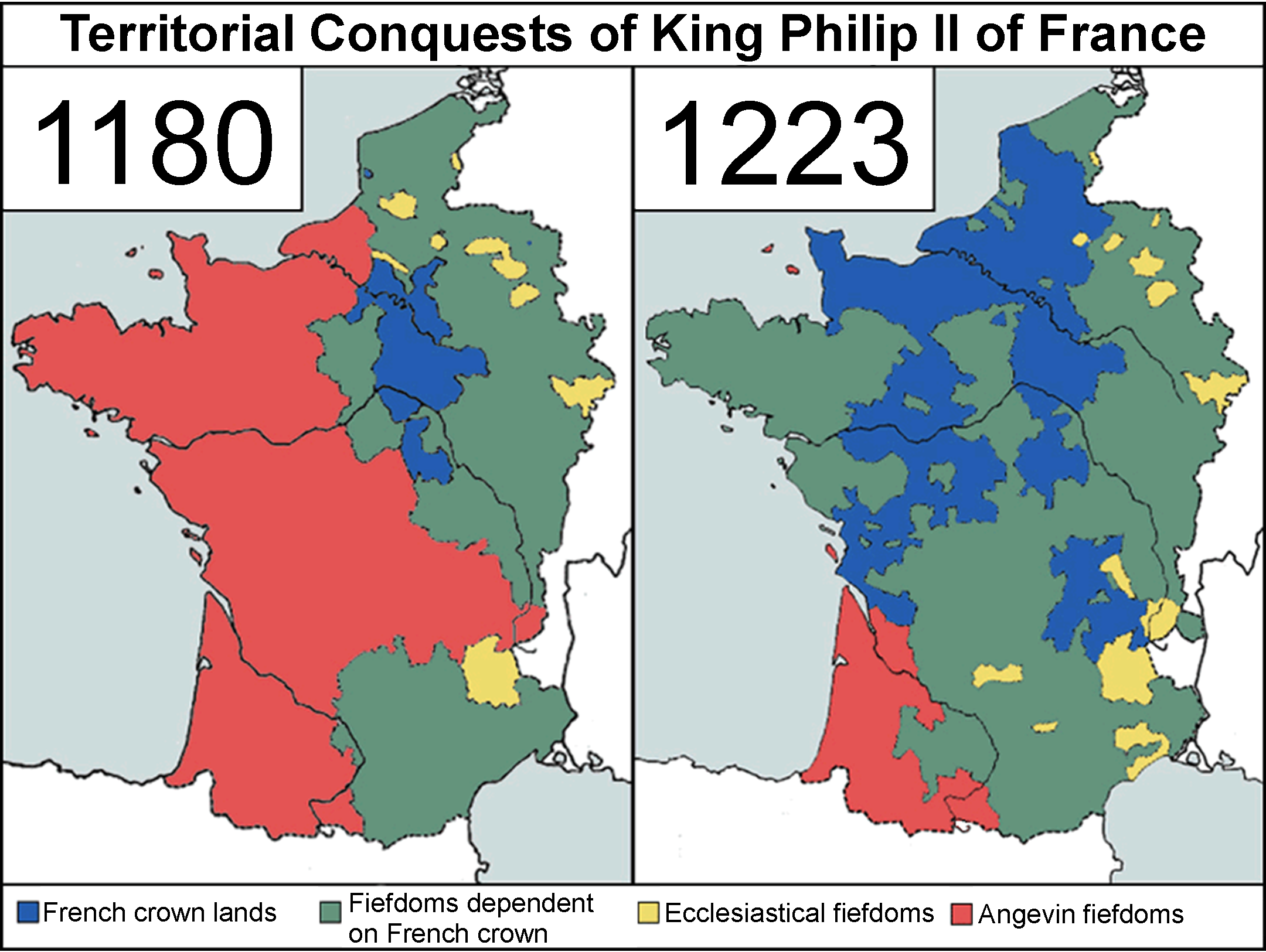
The Kingdom of France at the beginning at end of Philip II's reign, with the Royal Domain shown in blue

The prospect of a powerful French king dominating Western Europe was a major concern to both the Holy Roman Emperor and the numerous counts and princes in the Low Countries, who felt threatened by this significant and rapid expansion of the Royal Domain (which had included the County of Vermandois, granted to the king after the death of its countess in 1293) and formed a coalition against Philip II. At the subsequent Battle of Bouvines in 1214, Philip soundly defeated this coalition and cemented his new acquisitions.

Thanks to Philip II's expansion of the royal domain, the annual revenue of the crown almost doubled between 1204 and 1222. His victory at Bovines also ensured the peaceful transfer of the county of Artois to the French Royal Domain upon the ascension of his son, Louis VIII, who had inherited it through his mother Isabella of Hainault, Count of Artois. Emboldened by his father's success against the Plantagenets, Louis confiscated the counties of Poitou, Saintonge, Angoumois, and Périgord from Henry III of England, thereby shrinking the Duchy of Aquitaine down to Gascony in the far south-west.

Despite Henry III formerly renouncing his claim to it in 1259, subsequent kings of England regarded the recapture of Normandy, homeland of their ancestor William the Conqueror, as essential. Although the Duchy was later reconquered by Henry V, it became French once and for all in 1449 (with the exception of the Channel Islands, which remain a possession of the British crown to this day).

=== Southward expansion of the Crown lands ===
The next substantial addition to the Royal Domain came in 1229, when Louis the Lion exploited the Albigensian Crusade against the Cathars and imposed his authority on the County of Toulouse, which became the province of Languedoc. Until the revolution, the province comprised eight of the modern French departments in Le Midi, and was able to preserve several of the County of Toulouse's own institutions, including a 'parliament' (a sovereign court of justice) and États (assemblies which voted on taxes and which decided on communal investments).

The fourteenth century saw the Kings of France both continue to bring more of their kingdom's lands under their direct control, and expand the frontiers of the kingdom to the south-east, at the expense of the Holy Roman Empire. Starting with the town of Viviers in 1306, king Philip IV began the gradual annexation of the Kingdom of Arles, an imperial fief. When the city of Lyon, a former capital of the Gauls and an important crossroads in European commerce, was handed over to Philip by the Archbishop of Lyon in 1312, Emperor Henry VII protested but made no attempts to reverse it.

In 1349, Philip VI purchased another imperial possession, the southern territory of Dauphiné, expanding both the Royal Domain and the kingdom of France towards the Alps. The title of Dauphin was subsequently given to his eldest son and heir - a condition of the sale - and used by all future heirs to the French throne. Charles V's conquest of Provence in 1384, meanwhile, significantly increased the revenues of the French Crown, along with the length of the kingdom's southern coastline.

As their domain expanded, rather than rule their new acquisitions directly from Paris, several kings chose instead to create new dukedoms and grant them to a younger son, while the eldest continued to inherit the crown. This became known as the appanage system, and the first king to grant an appanage was Henry I in 1032. Louis VIII granted the counties of Poitou and Auvergne - captured from the English by his father Philip II - as appendages to his third son Alphonse in 1225.

Under this system the territory would, after the death of the junior royal son, pass down the senior male line. It could not be sold, and if there was no direct heir it would revert to the royal domain. Many dukedoms and counties did find their way back into the royal domain via this system (such as Poitou and Auvergne when Count Alphonse died childless in 1271). Although in theory these new dynasties - junior or "cadet" branches of the royal family - would be more loyal to the crown, the appanage system had the potential to backfire.

The House of Valois-Burgundy, effectively founded in 1363 when king John II awarded the Duchy of Burgundy to his youngest son Philip the Bold, gradually accumulated territories within both the Kingdom of France (such as Flanders and Artois in 1384) and the neighbouring Holy Roman Empire (such as Brabant in 1430 and Hainault in 1432). The Dukes of Burgundy would eventually hold territory encompassing much of the Netherlands, including the major trading centres of Bruges, Brussels, Antwerp and Amsterdam, which made the Burgundian Court one of the wealthiest in Europe.

In an attempt to seize control of the government during the reign of the mentally unstable Charles VI, in 1407 soldiers loyal to Duke John the Fearless murdered the king's brother, Louis, Duke of Orleans, plunging France into a civil war. John was himself murdered in 1419, prompting his son, Duke Philip the Good, to go as far as an alliance with the English during the latter stages of the Hundred Years' War, and the recognition of Henry V of England as Charles VI's successor, thereby disinheriting the king's own son. By then, the Dukes of Burgundy had become determined to create an independent and territorially continuous Burgundian State that could equal if not surpass the Kingdom of France in wealth and power, and were it not for the death of Duke Charles the Bold in battle in 1477 without a male heir, their objective may eventually been fulfilled.

=== The Hundred Years' War ===
The kings of England remained the dukes of Aquitaine, as they had been since 1154, and continued to rule the territory as a vassal of England rather than of France. Tensions came to a head in 1337 when Philip VI formally confiscated Aquitaine from Edward III of England as punishment for offering refuge to his political rival Robert III of Artois. Edward - grandson of Philip IV of France through his mother Isabella - responded by declaring himself king of France, initiating a conflict now known as the Hundred Years' War.

Following devastating French defeats at Crécy (1346) and Poitiers (1356), Philip VI was forced to sign the Treaty of Brétigny in 1360. Edward agreed to renounce his claim to the French throne in exchange for a greatly enlarged Aquitaine and the port of Calais, which gave him control of the narrowest part of the English Channel.

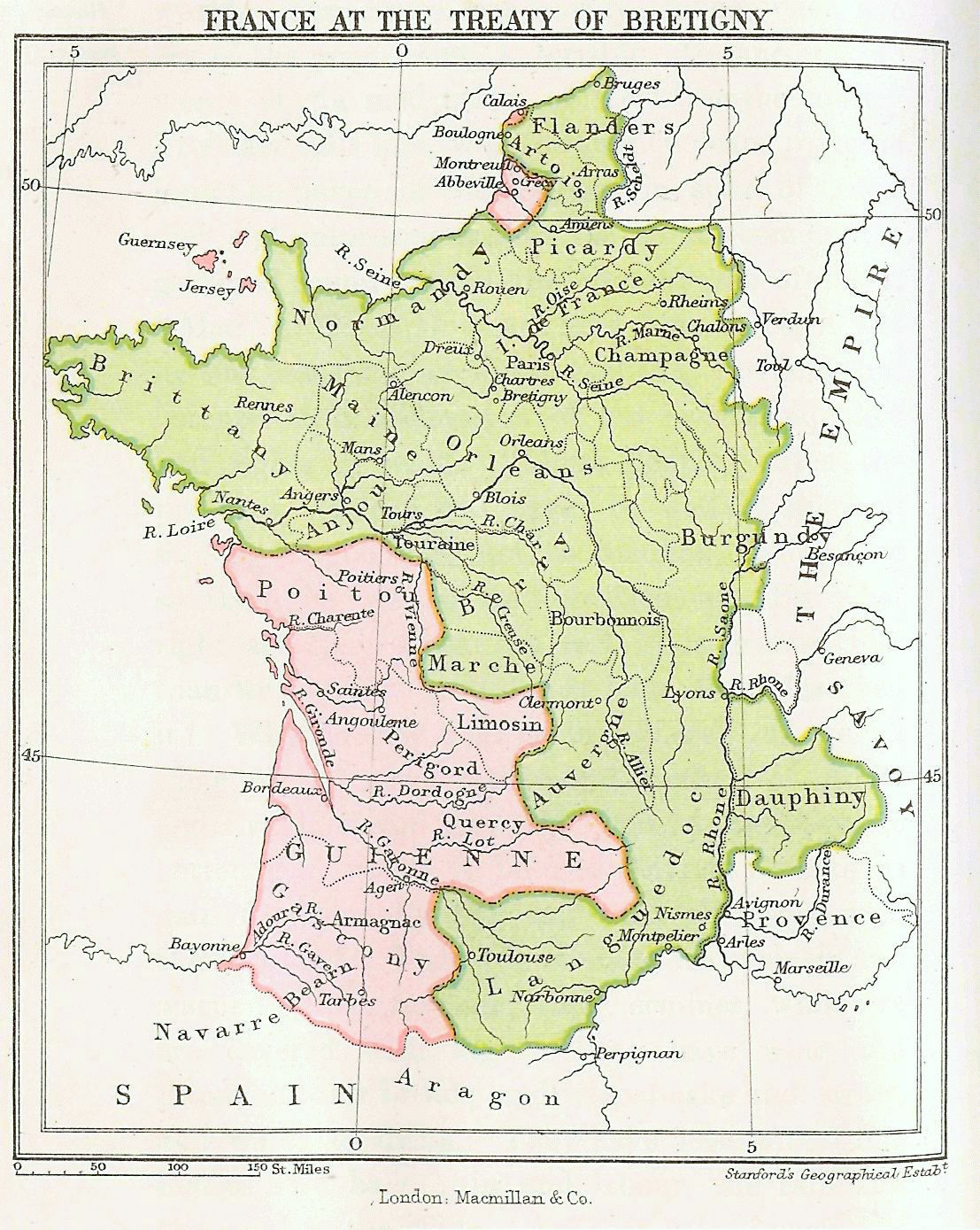
France after 1360

Edward was proclaimed by the treaty as 'Lord of Aquitaine', in which capacity he was not considered a vassal to the kings of France nor was required to pay homage to them. In effect, Aquitaine was no longer part of the kingdom of France.

Fortunes continued to swing back and forth over the next century. During the reign of Charles V, English possessions were gradually whittled down to a small area of Atlantic coast between Bordeaux and the Pyrenees. Although a period of relative peace between England and France then ensued during the reign of Charles VI, he proved a weak and ineffective ruler prone to bouts of severe mental illness. A struggle for control of the government gradually ensued between two factions of the nobility: the Armagnacs, led by king's younger brother Louis, duke of Orléans, and the Burgundians, led by the king's uncle, Philip, duke of Burgundy. The association of Duke Louis in 1407 turned this struggle into all-out civil war.

Henry V of England sensed an opportunity to capitalise on the chaos in France, and invaded in 1415. Reasserting his great-grandfather Edward III's claim to the French throne, his victory at Agincourt (1415) wiped out most of Charles VI's best knights, and enabled him to conquer Normandy and parts of the île de France. In 1419, shortly after Henry entered Paris, John, Duke of Burgundy was assassinated by the Armagnacs, and John's son Philip swiftly formed an alliance with the English king.

At the Treaty of Troyes (1420), ratified by Charles VI and the Burgundians, Henry V of England was declared heir to the throne of France, and would act as regent until Charles VI died. Charles VI's son the Dauphin Charles, now the head of the Armagnac faction, was declared illegitimate and his daughter Princess Catherine was betrothed to the king of England. Although in theory the treaty handed over France in its entirety to the English, in practice it served to split France in two, with only those lands occupied by England and the Duke of Burgundy - north of the river Loire - formally recognising it. In any event, both Charles VI and Henry V died within a few weeks of each other in 1422, after which the Anglo-Burgundian half of France declared Henry and Catherine's infant son Henry VI as their new king (as Henry II of France), while the Armagnac half declared Charles VII as their new king.

France at the Treaty of Troyes in 1420: English territory in red, Burgundian territory in purple, both recognising the treaty; Armagnac territory, not recognising the treaty, in blue

The tide of the Hundred Years' War would turn dramatically upon the appearance of Joan of Arc, who led the French to relieve the Siege of Orléans (1429). At an audience with Charles VII shortly after, Joan told him she was on a mission from God, and must recapture Rheims and have him crowned in its cathedral as the rightful king of France (Henry VI of England had just been crowned king of France in Paris). Rheims was deep in the heart of English territory at the time, and Joan's mission seemed unlikely to succeed. But after a successful campaign through the Loire valley she achieved her aim and Charles VII was crowned at Rheims cathedral in July 1430.

Joan's belief that she was on a divine mission, and the somewhat miraculous turnaround of the Armagnacs' fortunes, turned what had been a conflict between English and French royal dynasties into a religious war. Consequently, when captured by the Burgundians and handed over to the English, they believed it necessary to convict her as heretic before burning her at the stake. Although her military exploits lasted barely a year, Joan had managed to inspire the French to such an extent that in the space of a generation, the English were driven out of France altogether (but for Calais).

The Burgundians ended their alliance with the English in 1435 at the Congress of Arras, effectively ending the Armagnac-Burgundian struggle and uniting the entire French nobility against the English. A far cry from the Plantagenet/Capetian territorial disputes of previous centuries, by now England was increasingly viewed as a foreign power that needed to be driven from French soil once and for all.

The French victory at Castillon in 1453 marked not only the end of the Hundred Years' War, but to three centuries of English rule in Gascony, finally bringing the south-west of France under royal control.

== Early modern period (1453–1789) ==
=== The Burgundian inheritance and the rise of the Habsburgs ===
Both the succession of the Duchy of Burgundy, and the desire to gain a foothold in Italy, were the principal causes of the first of a series of conflicts with the ruling dynasty of Austria and the Holy Roman Empire, the Habsburgs.

France in the late 15th century. Note the significant increase in the size of the royal domain (lightest blue) since 1154, and the extensive Burgundian possessions (yellow)

Duke Charles the Bold of Burgundy's dream of becoming king of a territorially continuous state were ended when he was killed in battle at the Battle of Nancy in 1477. With no son to succeed him, upon his death his various possessions were divided. Although his daughter, Mary of Burgundy inherited the Burgundian Netherlands and that part of Burgundy that lay outside of the Kingdom of France (the Franche-Comté, or Free County of Burgundy), under Salic Law the Duchy of Burgundy and the County of Flanders could not be passed down through a female line. Therefore, as far as king Louis XI was concerned, these had now been absorbed into the Kingdom of France, though he would have to go to war to assert his claim over the territories.

Louis was determined not only to gain direct control over Flanders - a French fief since the days of West Francia - but to seize Mary's other lands in the low countries, which included the wealthy cities of Antwerp and Amsterdam. He attempted to marry his young son to Mary so that a future grandson could inherit all Mary's processions. However, Mary instead married Maximilian of Austria, heir of the Habsburg dynasty, future Holy Roman Emperor and Louis XI's fierce rival. In the ensuing wars, Louis occupied Picardy and Artois, along with the county of Charolais further south, but was ultimately only able to hold on to Picardy at the Treaty of Senlis in 1493.

It was the son of Mary and Maximilian, Philip the Handsome, who went on to inherit Flanders, the Burgundian Netherlands and Franche-Comté, cementing a French-Habsburg rivalry that would endure for the next three centuries. The recapture of Flanders was attempted by many more French kings, with very limited success. Although it later briefly became part of the First French Republic, most of the medieval County of Flanders would spend the next 300 years as part of the Holy Roman Empire, before ultimately ending up forming part of modern-day Belgium.

Habsburg power was unexpectedly expanded even further as the result of a succession crisis in the Spanish kingdoms of Castile and Aragon, effectively united through the marriage of Ferdinand II of Aragon and Isabella I of Castile. When their only son, eldest daughter and grandson all died in quick succession, Philip the Handsome's wife Joanna - Ferdinand and Isabella's second daughter - became the heir to both her parents' kingdoms. Although Philip died young and grief-stricken Joanna was incarcerated on grounds of insanity, their son Charles eventually inherited each of his four grandparents' realms: the Burgundian Netherlands, the Archduchy of Austria, and the kingdoms of Aragon and Castile (along with Aragon's processions in southern Italy and Castile's burgeoning empire in the Americas). In 1519, Charles was elected Holy Roman Emperor, succeeding his grandfather Maximilian as overlord of the numerous German states. From the point of view of France, it was now completely encircled by Habsburg lands.

Perhaps unsurprisingly given the vast empire he had inherited, Charles V believed it was his destiny to rule over all Christendom. The kings of France did all they could to curtail Charles's power during his reign, even forming alliances with England and the Muslim Ottoman Empire.

=== The Italian Wars ===
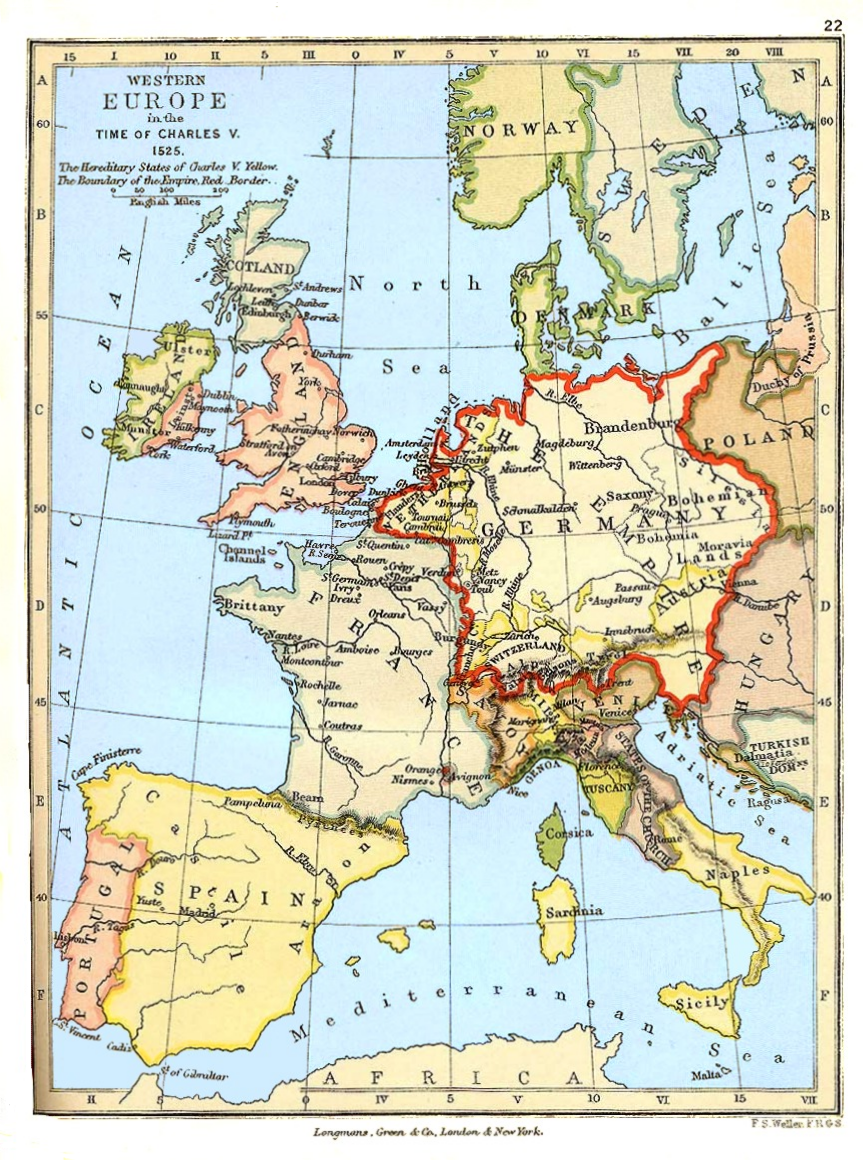
Western Europe in 1525: After Francis I's final defeat in Italy, Emperor Charles V's lands (in yellow) encircle the kingdom of France (the Holy Roman Empire boundary is shown in red)

Charles VIII's invasion of Italy in 1494 began a series of conflicts known as the Italian Wars, during which the Kings of France jostled with the Habsburgs for control of the Italian peninsula. Attempting to capitalise on a power vacuum created by the collapse of the Italic League, Charles VIII attempted but ultimately failed to become King of Naples, a title which had been promised to Louis XI by his uncle René I of Naples.

Charles's successor Louis XII was much more successful in Italy, conquering both Naples and the Duchy of Milan during the Second Italian War (1499–1504). But French rule of Naples lasted only until 1504, while French rule in Milan persisted on-and-off until Francis I's disastrous defeat and capture at Pavia in 1525, after which Habsburg rule in Milan and Naples was assured. Francis was also forced to renounce in perpetuity his suzerainty over the County of Flanders.

Although Charles V's series of abdications in 1555 had divided the Habsburg inheritance into a Spanish branch and an Austrian branch, the lands which surrounded the Kingdom of France continued to be ruled by one man, his son Philip. Along with Spain, Philip ruled the Burgundian Netherlands (now reorganised into the Seventeen Provinces or "Spanish Netherlands"), Franche-Comté and more distantly, Milan. And until Philip's Spanish Armada was defeated in 1588, it was not clear that England would not become part of this encirclement.

The so-called "Spanish Road", running south to north via Milan, Franche-Comté and the Spanish Netherlands, was a vital trade route and military supply line for Philip, particularly once the Dutch Republic began fighting a war of independence against him. It was also what enabled Philip to prepare for a land invasion of England, in the event that his Armada had been successful. Cutting off the Spanish Road became a key motivating factor in France's efforts to expand eastwards over the next two centuries.

=== Henry IV and continued Habsburg rivalry ===
At the time of his accession in 1589, the first French king from the House of Bourbon, Henry IV, brought the possessions of the last remaining great feudal house, the Albrets, to the royal domain. These possessions, comprising Béarn, Armagnac and Limousin, were inherited through his mother, Joan of Albret.

Henry IV also inherited another dispute with Habsburg Spain. By his mother, he was descended from the kings of Navarre, whose territory had been substantially reduced by Ferdinand of Aragon's invasion in 1513. Although left with only that part of Navarre north of the Pyrenees (Lower Navarre), from this time onwards the kings of France continued to claim the whole of Navarre and use the title of 'King of Navarre'.

Upon becoming King of Navarre, Henry IV also became - along with the Bishop of Urgell) - one of two Co-Princes of Andorra, the tiny principality in the Pyrenees created in 1278. All subsequent French heads of state would retain this title, although only one - the Emperor Napoleon - would ever annex the territory. The French president remains co-prince of Andorra to this day.

In 1599 Henry IV demanded the Duke of Savoy, Charles Emmanuel I, hand over several territories on the West Bank of the Rhône or face invasion. The Duke had seized the town of Saluzzo, a French exclave, 11 years earlier and was secretly plotting with the Spanish governor of Milan to secure military assistance in seizing more French territory. When he refused Henry's demands, the king invaded and quickly overran the Duchy. The treaty of Lyon, signed in 1601, let Charles Emmanuel keep Saluzzo but handed Bresse, Bugey, Valromey and the Pays de Gex - which together constitute the modern Ain department - to France which, crucially, closed off one of the Alpine valleys used by the Spanish Road.

Despite the ongoing rivalry with the Habsburgs, the prospect of any conflict with them greatly offended many of the Catholics of France, who saw Habsburg Spain as the first line of defence against the growing threat of Protestantism. Henry IV's queen, Marie de' Medici and the Duke d'Épernon were notable catholic members of the royal court who were opposed to any wars with Spain. Despite Henry's best efforts to balance the interests of Protestants and Catholics in his kingdom, he was assassinated by a Catholic zealot in 1610.

=== Wars of the 17th century and expansion in the east ===
Territorial conquests from 1552 to 1798

Henry's son Louis XIII and his prime minister Richelieu went on the offensive in 1635, invading Lombardy and severing the Spanish road. This brought France into the Thirty Years' War on the side of Sweden, the Dutch Republic and several German states, already fighting the Imperial forces of the Holy Roman Empire (still ruled by the Austrian Habsburgs) and Spain. However hostilities would continue between France and Spain even after the Peace of Westphalia had brought the Thirty Years' War to a close in 1648.

The capture of Breisach in 1639 left France in control of Alsace, destroying the Spanish road once and for all, while the French victory over Spain at the Battle of Rocroi in 1643 - just a few days into the long reign of Louis XIV - showed the rest of Europe that France was now the foremost military power on the continent.

The Westphalia treaty granted to France the margraviate of Haute-Alsace and the Décapole, a federation of ten Alsatian towns. Both had formerly been Austrian Habsburg processions. The treaty also confirmed French sovereignty over the Three Bishoprics, annexed a century earlier.

The Holy Roman Empire after the Peace of Westphalia in 1648, with Austrian Habsburg territories in green and Spanish Habsburg territories in yellow. Following the proclamation of Dutch independence (United Netherlands), the Spanish Netherlands were now much reduced in size, but remained on France's eastern frontier along with the Franche-Comté. In-between lay France's newly won exclaves in Alsace (shown in pink)

France went on to make gains against the Spanish in Flanders and in the Pyrenees, but with neither side able to make a decisive breakthrough and both financially exhausted, they agreed peace at the Treaty of the Pyrenees (1659). As well as the transfer of Artois from the Spanish Netherlands to France, the treaty finalised the Franco-Spanish frontier which remains unchanged to this day. In exchange for the county of Roussillon in north-eastern Principality of Catalonia, France promised to end its support of the Catalan revolt against Spanish rule, whilst the long-running dispute over the boundary between (Spanish) Upper Navarre and (French) Lower Navarre was ended. Meanwhile, the Isle of the Pheasants, the island on the Bidasoa river where the treaty was signed, has switched sovereignty between France and Spain every six months ever since and is the smallest condominium in the world.

Although the northern half of Spanish Netherlands had won its independence as the Dutch Republic, the southern half - which bordered France - remained in Spanish hands, and included the wealthy area of Flanders. Coveted by the kings of France since its loss in 1493, Louis XIV invaded Flanders both during the War of Devolution (1667–68) and the Franco-Dutch War (1672–1678). At the treaty of Aix-la-Chapelle he gained Lille, Douai and Armentières, while at the Treaty of Nijmegen he gained Saint-Omer, Cambrai, Valenciennes and Maubeuge in Hainaut. Together with Louis' purchase of Dunkirk from king Charles II of England for £320,000 in 1662 (the English having earlier captured the town from the Spanish) - this all but marked the limit of France's expansion in the north, apart from a twenty-year period during the revolutionary/Napoleonic era.

Another important success of the Treaty of Nijmegen was the acquisition of Franche-Comte, the "Free County of Burgundy", which had been a Habsburg procession and a thorn in France's side since Mary of Burgundy's death in 1482, and separated from the Duchy of Burgundy since the death of her father Charles the Bold in 1477.

Emboldened by his earlier successes, Louis XIV occupied Habsburg-ruled Luxembourg during the Nine Years War. By the Treaty of Rijswijk in 1697 he renounced most of these newly-taken lands but retained Saarlouis and Lower Alsace, which included the town of Strasbourg. Thus almost the whole of Alsace was now entirely French: something that Germany, once it was at last unified in the 19th century, would later attempt to reverse.

=== Lorraine, Corsica and consolidation of territory ===
Although French participation in the War of Spanish Succession did not result in any territorial gains, it marked a turning point in its centuries-old rivalry with the Habsburgs. When the Spanish and Austrian branches of the Habsburg dynasty went to war with one another in 1700 - drawing in most of the other powers of Europe - France allied with Spain, supporting the claim of Philip V (Louis XIV's grandson) to the Spanish throne. The Peace of Utrecht that ended the war, intending to preserve a balance of power on the continent, forced Philip and his heirs to cede any claim to the throne of France, guaranteeing the two kingdoms and their empires could never be ruled by the same person. The treaty also transferred the Spanish Netherlands to Austria, leaving the kingdom of Spain itself as the only Spanish territory on France's borders.

In the latter years of Louis XIV's reign, France's newly expanded borders in the east were strengthened by the construction of a network of modern fortresses. The fortified towns to the immediate north of the Duchy of Lorraine - Montmédy, Thionville, Longwy and Saarlouis - were intended to isolate it from the other states in the Holy Roman Empire, in particular the Austrian Netherlands, and ultimately undermine the independence of the dukes. Duke Charles IV and his nephew Charles V, who both served as officers in the Austrian army, adopted a policy hostile towards France.

Since 1632, France had repeatedly occupied Lorraine in periods of war, without annexing it. But an opportunity would present itself in 1736, upon the marriage of Duke Francis III to the heiress of the Austrian House of Habsburg Maria Theresa, which took place at a time when Austria was fighting the War of Polish succession against Spain and Sardinia. Francis agreed to leave Lorraine to the recently deposed King of Poland and Louis XV's father-in-law, Stanisław Leszczyński, so that it would merge with the French crown after his death. In exchange, Francis would receive the Grand Duchy of Tuscany (which would become vacant once the last Medici Grand Duke died without an heir). The resulting Treaty of Vienna successfully brought an end to hostilities and ensured Lorraine became part of the French kingdom when duke Stanisław I died in 1766.

In 1760 the County of Charolais, a former Burgundian and later Spanish Habsburg exclave given to one of Louis XIV's generals Louis le Grand Condé by the Treaty of Nijmegen in 1678, was absorbed into France following the death of the last count of Charolais and Louis' descendent, Charles.

Meanwhile, having received limited military assistance from France in trying to crush a rebellion which had begun in 1729, the Republic of Genoa was losing its grip on the island of Corsica. After the proclamation of an independent Corsican Republic, and having been all but driven from the island but for two coastal forts, by 1767 it was clear the financially exhausted Genoese - who had also just been humiliated in the War of Austrian Succession - would not be able to repay France, and so offered to cede their claim to Corsica in exchange for their debt being annulled.

This provided a timely opportunity for Louis XV, who had hoped to establish a foothold in the Mediterranean by capturing British-held Menorca during the Seven Years' War, but had been forced to cede it back to Britain (along with almost all of France's North American and Asian colonies) at the 1763 Treaty of Paris. The Republic of Genoa formally renounced their claim to Corsica, which it had held since 1284, in May 1768 and pledged it to France, who invaded the island in September and completed their conquest at the Battle of Ponte Novu the following May.

Thus, on the eve of the Revolution, the modern, hexagonal shape of France was accomplished, but for a handful of foreign enclaves that remained in the recent zone of expansion: Franche-Comté, Alsace and Lorraine.

== Since the French Revolution (1789–present) ==
=== Reorganisation of the territory ===
The French monarchy, along with the Kingdom of France itself, was abolished on 21 September 1792, when the French First Republic was proclaimed.

The Revolution did away with the concept of ownership of political entities by individuals. As such the French Republic was a unitary state rather than a mosaic of vassals or "semi-states". As a means of severing old ties of allegiance, and of rationalising administration, the old divisions of territory based on feudal ownership were replaced by "departments" of roughly uniform size and named after geographical features such as rivers (even Paris was in the "Seine" department).

=== Expansion of the Republic ===
The establishment of a revolutionary regime in France led most of the European monarchies to swiftly form coalitions against it. But the armies of the First Republic enjoyed a succession of victories against foreign powers which resulted in a considerable expansion of its territory. Its acquisitions in this period included:

The departments of the First French Republic in 1801. Note the cities of Bruxelles (Brussels), Gand (Ghent), and Anvers (Antwerp), formerly of the Austrian Netherlands and incorporated in 1795

- Avignon and the Comtat Venaissin (1791);
- The Duchy of Savoy (1792);
- The County of Nice and several small enclaves including the County of Montbéliard and the Principality of Salm-Salm (1793);
- The Austrian Netherlands and the Prince-Bishopric of Liège (1795);
- The German states on the left bank of the Rhine (1797);
- The Republic of Geneva and the Republic of Mulhouse (1798);

With help from Great Britain, Corsican revolutionary and previous president of the Corsican Republic (1755–1768) Pasquale Paoli returned to the island in 1794 and proclaimed the Anglo-Corsican Kingdom. This was re-conquered by France in 1796.

=== First French Empire ===
Under Napoleon, French conquests continued. They were principally motivated by the aim of controlling the coasts of Europe. This was in the context of the struggle against the United Kingdom and the commercial blockade which that country imposed. In that way, the following were annexed:

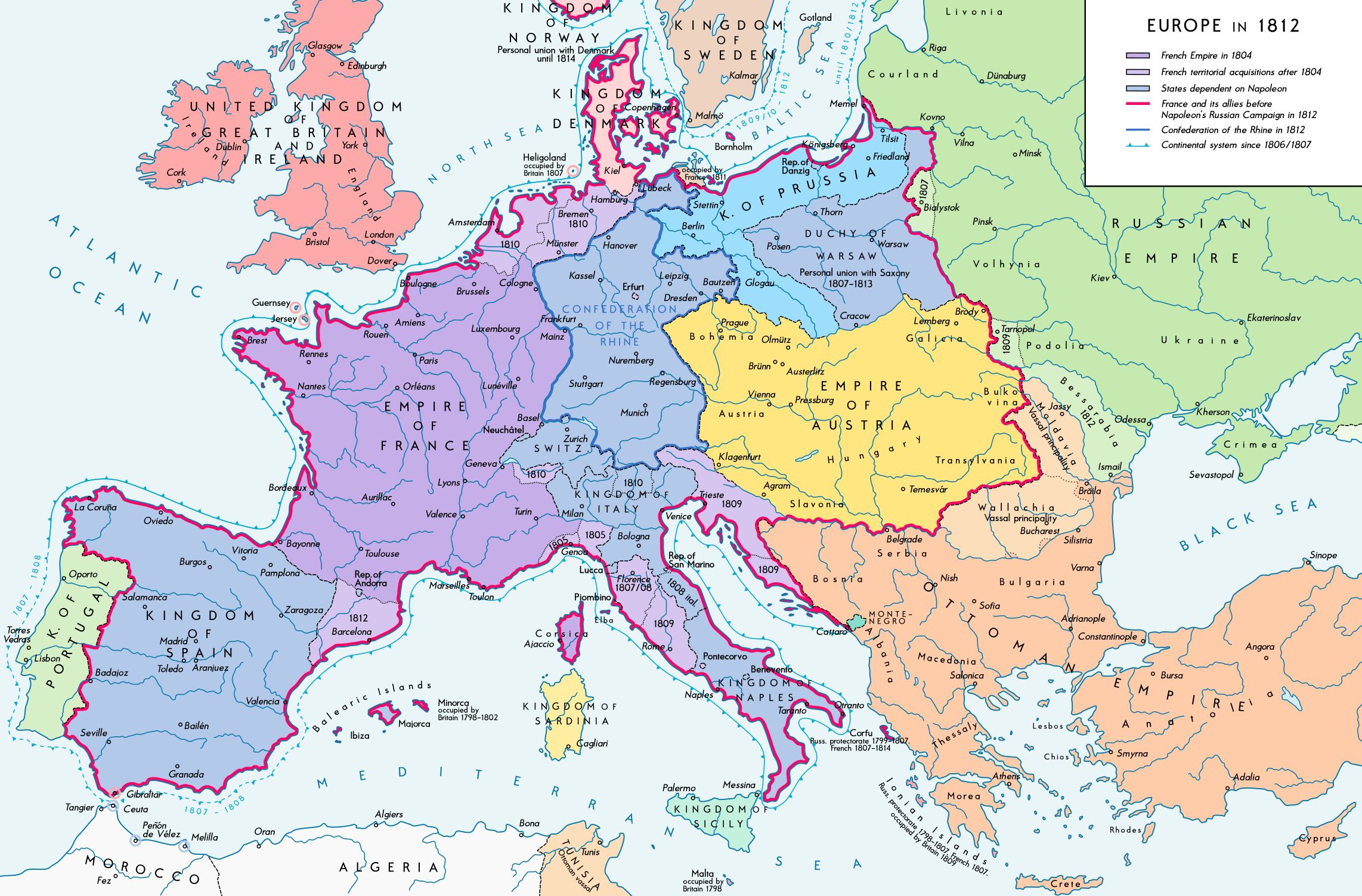
Europe at the height of Napoleon's power in 1812. The French Empire is shown in Purple, with vassal or client states in blue

- Piedmont, constituting all the Kingdom of Sardinia's territory on the European continent (1802);
- The Ligurian Republic (formerly the Republic of Genoa) (1805);
- The Kingdom of Etruria and the Duchy of Parma (1808);
- The Papal States, including Rome (1809);
- The Kingdom of Holland and the Valais (1810);
- The German North Sea coast, comprising the (Hanover, Oldenburg, Bremen, and Hamburg (1811);
- Lübeck, on the German Baltic coast (1811);
- Catalonia and Andorra (1812);
- The Illyrian Provinces, comprising the Dalmatian coast and other former territories of the Republic of Venice (1814).

=== 1815 redrawing ===
After Napoleon's final defeat at the battle of Waterloo, at the 1815 Congress of Vienna the continuing state of the Kingdom of France resembled its borders of 1791, though with the following differences:

- The former Austrian Netherlands and Prince-Bishopric of Liège were united with the former Dutch Republic to form a new state, the United Kingdom of the Netherlands. The son of the Dutch Republic's last Stadtholder became king William I of the Netherlands.
- Another new state, the Grand-Duchy of Luxembourg, was created with William I of the Netherlands as its Grand-Duke. Its citadel would serve as an outpost of the Prussian army.
- The bulk of the small German states on the left bank of the Rhine (below the River Lauter), were awarded to Prussia, despite their distance from the Prussian heartland and the difference in cultures. This was because the other European powers were watchful lest France should ever regain control of the region, and believed having the most powerful German state controlling it best ensured its security.
- France lost several strongholds covering her frontiers: Bouillon went to Luxembourg, Saarlouis went to Prussia and Landau went to Bavaria.

France kept all the enclaves that had still been part of the Holy Roman Empire before the Revolution in its northeast, scattered across five of the new departments:

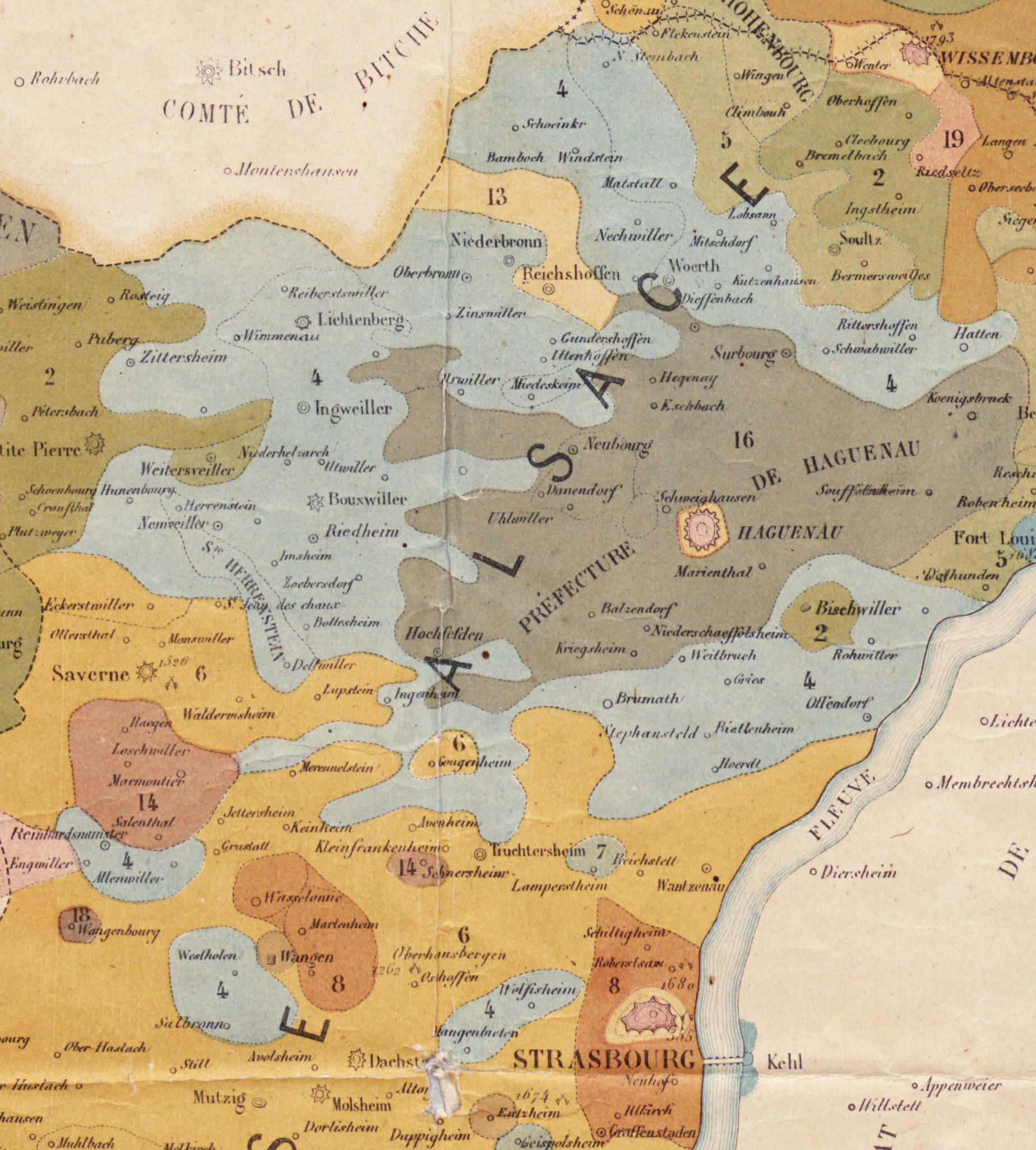
17C map of northern Alsace, displaying the possessions of Hanau-Lichtenberg (in blue)

- Haute-Saône: the County of Montbéliard, which had been held since 1444 by the House of Württemberg, annexed in 1793;
- Haut-Rhin: Riquewihr and the county of Horbourg, both also previously belonging to the ruling family of Württemberg-Monbéliard and annexed in 1793;
- Bas-Rhin: various former territories of Hanau-Lichtenberg west of the Rhine (bailiwicks of Bouxwiller, Brumath, Hatten, Ingwiller, Kutzenhausen, Offendorf, Pfaffenhoffen, Westhoffen, Wœrth, and Wolfisheim, annexed in 1793 from the Landgraviate of Hesse-Darmstadt; La Petite-Pierre, previously belonging to Palatine Zweibrücken though practically ruled by France since 1680; and Neuf-Sarrewerden (from the former County of Saarwerden, part of Nassau-Saarbrücken since 1527), also annexed in 1793;
- Moselle: the counties of Créhange and of Dabo and the Hanau-Lichtenberg bailiwick of Baerenthal, annexed in 1793, and the lordship of Lixing, annexed from Nassau-Saarbrücken in 1795;
- Vosges: the principality of Salm-Salm, annexed in 1793;

France also kept two additional former enclaves: in the Haut-Rhin, the Republic of Mulhouse, which had been affiliated to the Helvetic Confederation since 1515 and thus no longer in the Holy Roman Empire since 1648, had voted in favour of its reunion to France in 1798; and in Vaucluse, Avignon and the Comtat Venaissin, which had been property of the Holy See since 1274, was unilaterally annexed in 1791 and subsequently recognised as such by the Pope in the Treaty of Tolentino in 1797.

=== Intervention of France in Italian unification ===
Map charting the course of Italian unification. The striped areas were passed from the Kingdom of Sardinia to the Second French Empire in 1860, in exchange for helping Sardinia expel Austria from Lombardy

In 1858, minister of the Estates of Savoy Camillo Cavour promised Emperor Napoleon III the Duchy of Savoy and the county of Nice, in exchange for French help in driving the Austrians out of Italy (which was part of the wider struggle to unify the Italian states). Following French-Sardinian victories over Austria at Magneta and Solferino the following year, Austria ceded Lombardy to France, who immediately exchanged it with Sardinia for Savoy and Nice, as had been agreed. These acquisitions, ratified by the Treaty of Turin, represent by far the most significant additions to France's territory since the Revolution.

The independent principality of Monaco, which had previously been surrounded by the Kingdom of Sardinia (and had been a Sardinian protectorate since 1815) was now surrounded by France. Shortly after the Sardinians left the area the inhabitants of two towns within the principality, Roquebrune and Menton, chose by referendum to be joined with the County of Nice and with France. On 2 February 1861, Prince Charles III of Monaco and Napoleon III signed a treaty at Paris by which, in exchange for 4,000,000 francs, the prince and his successors would renounce in perpetuity, in favour of the Emperor of the French, all rights direct and indirect on these two communes.

=== Alsace-Lorraine: contention between France and Germany ===
Following the defeat of the Second French Empire in the Franco-Prussian War and the ratification of the Treaty of Frankfurt in 1871, all of Alsace except the French-speaking Territory of Belfort, was annexed by the new German Empire, along with the districts of Sarreguemines and Metz, and large parts of the districts of Sarrebourg, Château-Salins and Briey in Lorraine. Together with the cantons of Saales and Schirmeck in the Vosges, this constituted a total of 1,694 communes and 1,597,000 inhabitants, over an area of 1,447,000 hectares, which was reorganised into the territory of Elsaß-Lothringen. The new border between Germany and France was drawn along largely ethnic and linguistic lines, with the mostly French-speaking Metz area the notable exception.

All these territories would be recovered at the end of the First World War, by Article 27 of the Treaty of Versailles.

Alsace and Lorraine were annexed by Germany again in 1940. Unlike the rest of occupied France and the unoccupied so-called "Free France" (Vichy France) – which became a Nazi puppet state – Alsace-Lorraine was formally incorporated into the Third Reich. It was returned to France once again after World War II.

=== Since World War II ===
In the Treaty of Paris in 1947, France gained approximately 700 km^{2} of territory from Italy, spread over the departments of the Alpes-Maritimes, Hautes-Alpes and Savoie.

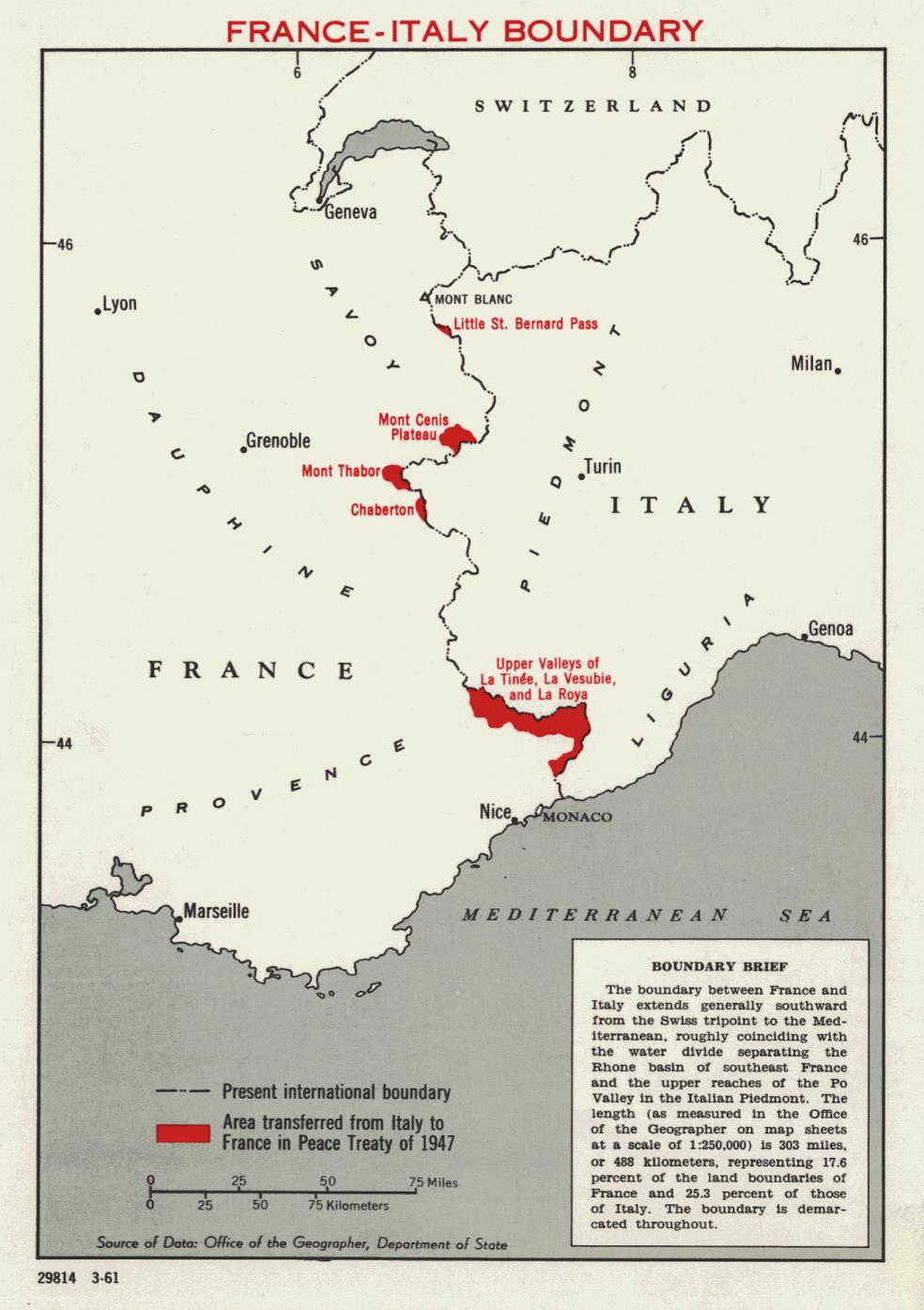
France-Italy Boundary after the Treaty of Paris, 1947

- annexation of the Tende Valley, which had remained Italian when the County of Nice became French in 1860. The border here now follows the main crest of the Alps. The Alpes-Maritimes departement saw its area extended by 560 km^{2}.
  - the upper valley of the Roya, that is the communes of Tende and La Brigue,
  - the hamlets of Libre, Piène-Basse and Piène-Haute (commune of Breil-sur-Roya),
  - the hamlet of Mollières (commune of Valdeblore),
  - the upper valleys of the Vésubie and the Tinée;
- displacement by several kilometres of the Italian border in the Mont-Cenis massif, thereby increasing French territory by 81.8 km^{2}, on the commune of Lanslebourg, Bramans and a small area in favour of the commune of Sollières-Sardières, Savoie. From this time on, the frontier has no longer followed the line of the crest but is on the slope of the Italian side. The Mont-Cenis Dam and reservoir, subsequently constructed on its slopes, is thus in France though on the Italian side of the ridge.
- annexation of the summit of Mont Thabor and its eastern slopes, notably the upper basin of the Vallée étroite (narrow valley), in the commune of Névache, Hautes-Alpes (47 km^{2}).
- annexation of Mont Chaberton (17.1 km^{2}), in the commune of Montgenèvre (Hautes-Alpes), notably of an Italian fort, destroyed by French forces at the opening of the Second World War.
- annexation of the western part of the Little St. Bernard Pass following the watershed. (3.22 km^{2}), to the benefit of the commune of Séez, Savoie.

Though the Paris Treaty settled disputes on these five points in the line of the border, in the area of the summits of Mont Blanc and Mont Blanc de Courmayeur, questions remain open.

== Minor modifications (1945–2006) ==
=== Modifications of France's frontiers with Andorra (2001) ===
In 2001, a treaty was concluded between France and Andorra mentioning amendment of the border. In it, two parcels of territory were exchanged, each 1.5 ha in area. The operation should permit Andorra to erect, on the land ceded to it, the viaduct which should link the Envalira tunnel to the French Route nationale 22.

=== Modifications of France's frontiers with Switzerland (1945–2002) ===
Since 1945 very many minor modifications of the frontier have been concluded with Switzerland.:

- 19 December 1947 : accord concerning the pounds at Kembs and at Ottmarsheim, of the lateral canal of the Rhine (modification of the frontier to take account of the diversion of the Rhine from the canal bed).
- 4 July 1949 : convention relating to the construction and use of the Basel-Mulhouse airport at Blotzheim (construction of the airport of Basel was done partially on land of the commune of Blotzheim; Switzerland reciprocated by secession of territory and Mulhouse (France) has benefited equally from the improved international airport. Furnishing and extending the airport have entailed the signing of a series of accords, some of which involved the exchange of land.
- 25 February 1953 : convention on the determination of the frontier in Lake Geneva (codification of the customary line of the frontier on the lake).
- 25 February 1953 : convention on various modifications of the frontier (exchange of land with Switzerland in Haut-Rhin, the Territory of Belfort and Doubs in order to conform with changes in the local topography).
- 25 February 1953 : convention on various modifications of the frontier along the French route nationale N206.
- 3 December 1956 : convention concerning the fixing the frontier between the canton of Basel-City (Switzerland) and the département of Haut-Rhin (France).
- 3 December 1959 : convention concerning rectifying the border between the canton of Neuchâtel and the département of Doubs.
- 3 December 1959 : convention on the correction of the stream, The Boiron.
- 3 December 1959 : convention relative to a modification of the border between the canton of Vaud and the département of Ain (between marker stones 287 and 299).
- 3 December 1959 : convention concerning a rectification of the border of the Hermance.
- 23 August 1963 : convention concerning a rectifying the border between the Canton of Valais and the département of Haute-Savoie;
- 10 July 1973 : convention concerning a rectification of the frontier between the département of Haute-Savoie and the Canton of Geneva;
- 4–7 July 1977 : exchange of notes relating to the coming into force of the convention of 25 February 1953 between France and Switzerland on various modifications of the border (RN 206) - The date of coming into force was fixed for 26 November 1979.
- 18 September 1996 : convention including rectifying the border between the département of Doubs and the Canton of Vaud;
- 18 September 1996 : convention aimed at rectifying the border, following the joining of the motorways between Saint-Julien-en-Genevois, Haute-Savoie, and Bardonnex, canton of Geneva (permitted Switzerland to arrange holdings necessary for the construction of a road interchange).
- 18 January 2002 : convention aimed at four border rectifications between the canton of Geneva and the départements of Haute-Savoie (communes of Viry, Valleiry et Veigy-Foncenex) and of Ain (commune de Saint-Genis-Pouilly), dealing with a total area of 578 m^{2}, aimed at making the line of the frontier more orderly and rational, and so taking into account developments of the land with the passage of time, both in France and in Switzerland, of which most had already been backed by the adjoining owners.

=== Modifications of France's frontiers with Luxembourg (2006) ===
In July 2006, a treaty between Luxembourg and France exchanged parcels of 8.096079 hectares, to allow the formation of infrastructure financed by the Government of the Grand Duchy of Luxembourg, on French territory, (in the commune of Russange, Moselle). The work was connected with the industrial site of West Belval.

== Maps showing the development of the territory ==
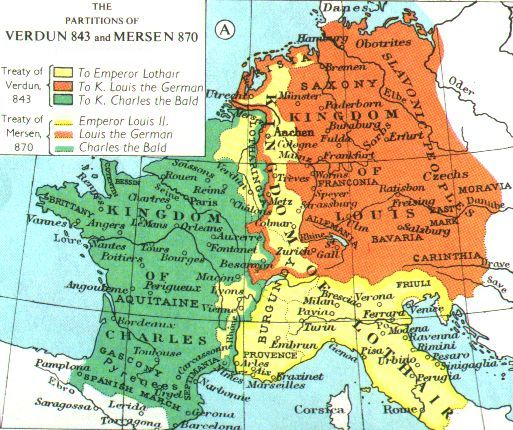
France in Europe from 843 to 870
Francia

France in the early 11th century
French royal domain

France at the end of the 12th century
French royal domain

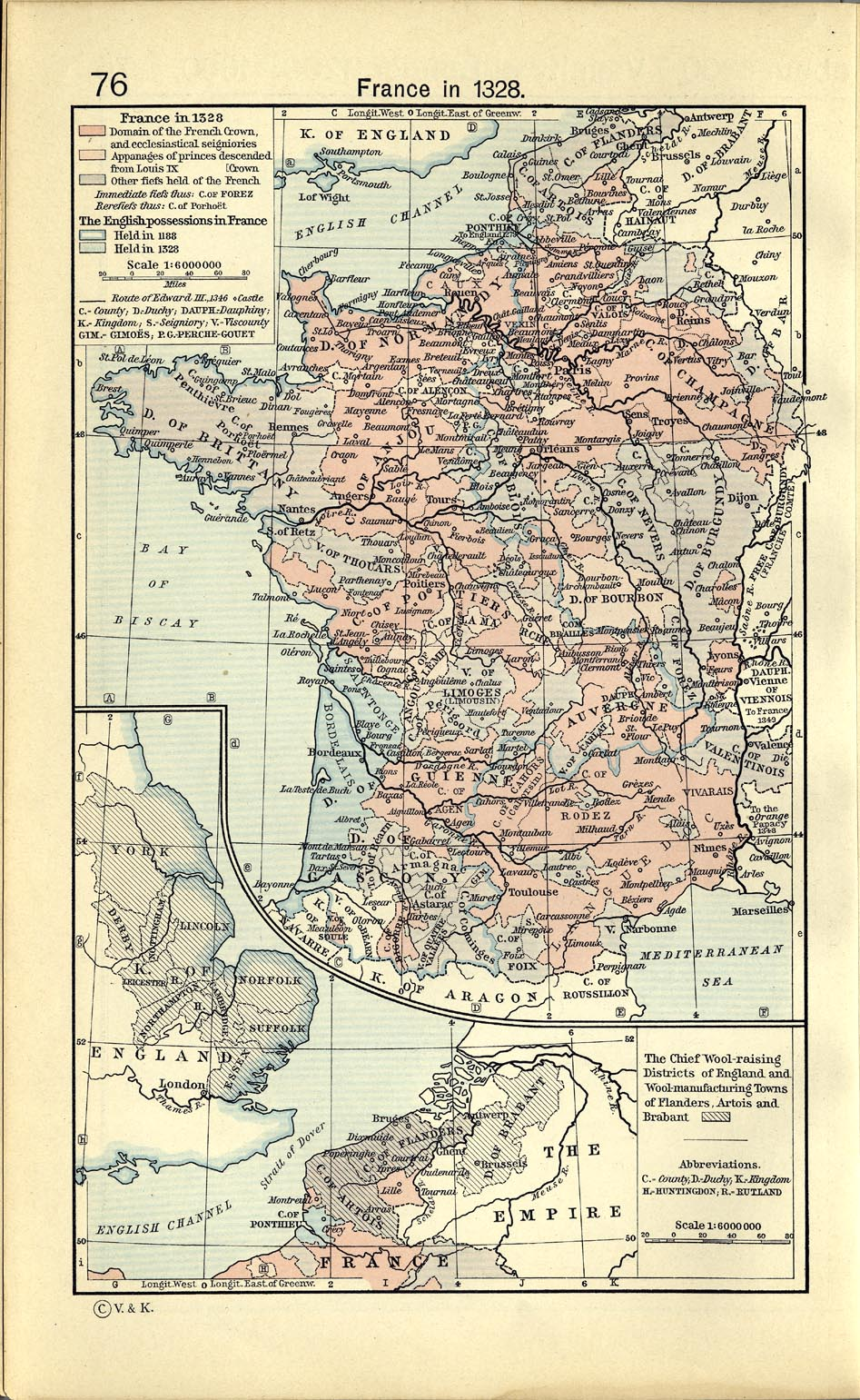
France in 1328

France at the end of the 15th century
French royal domain

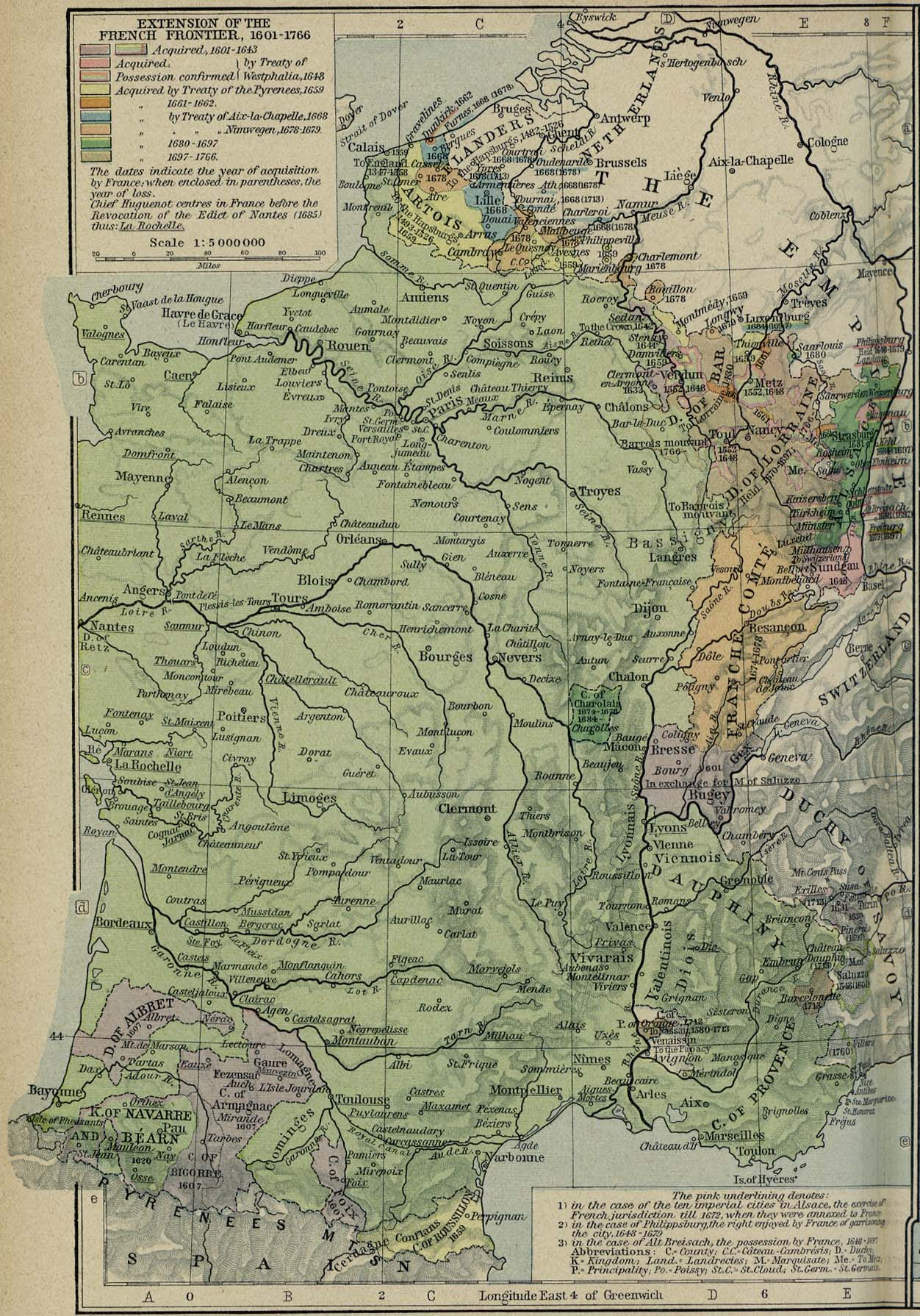
Frontiers of France: 1601 to 1766

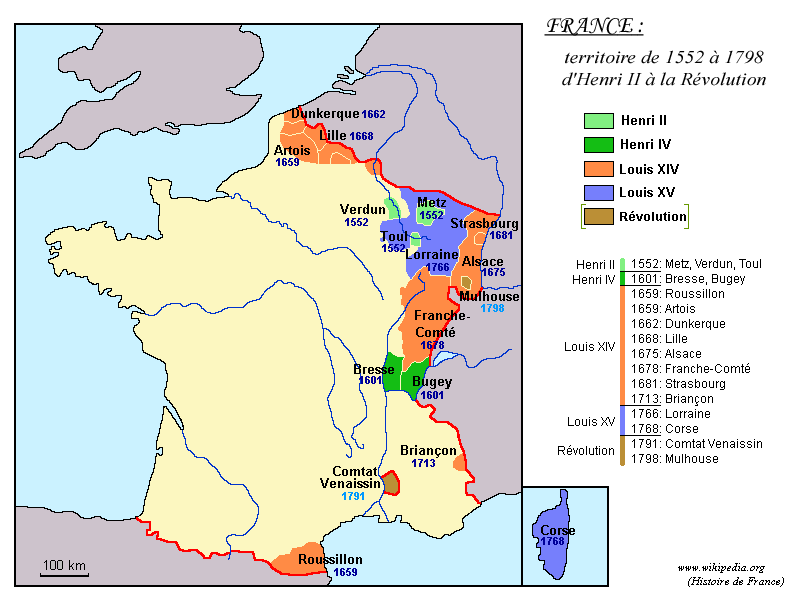
Territorial conquests from 1552 to 1798

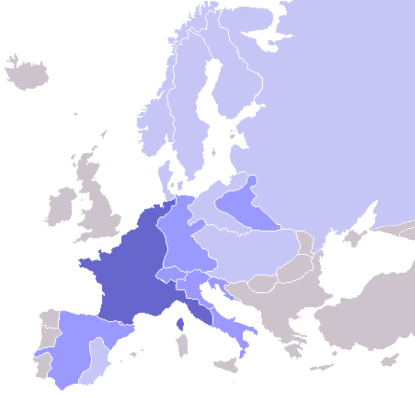
France in 1810 under Napoléon. All shades of blue = states operating a blockade against the UK
France

== See also ==
- Crown lands of France
- French colonial empire
- Hundred Years' War
- Malgré-nous
