= Hôtel de Ville, Mulhouse =

Town hall in Mulhouse, France

Hôtel de Ville
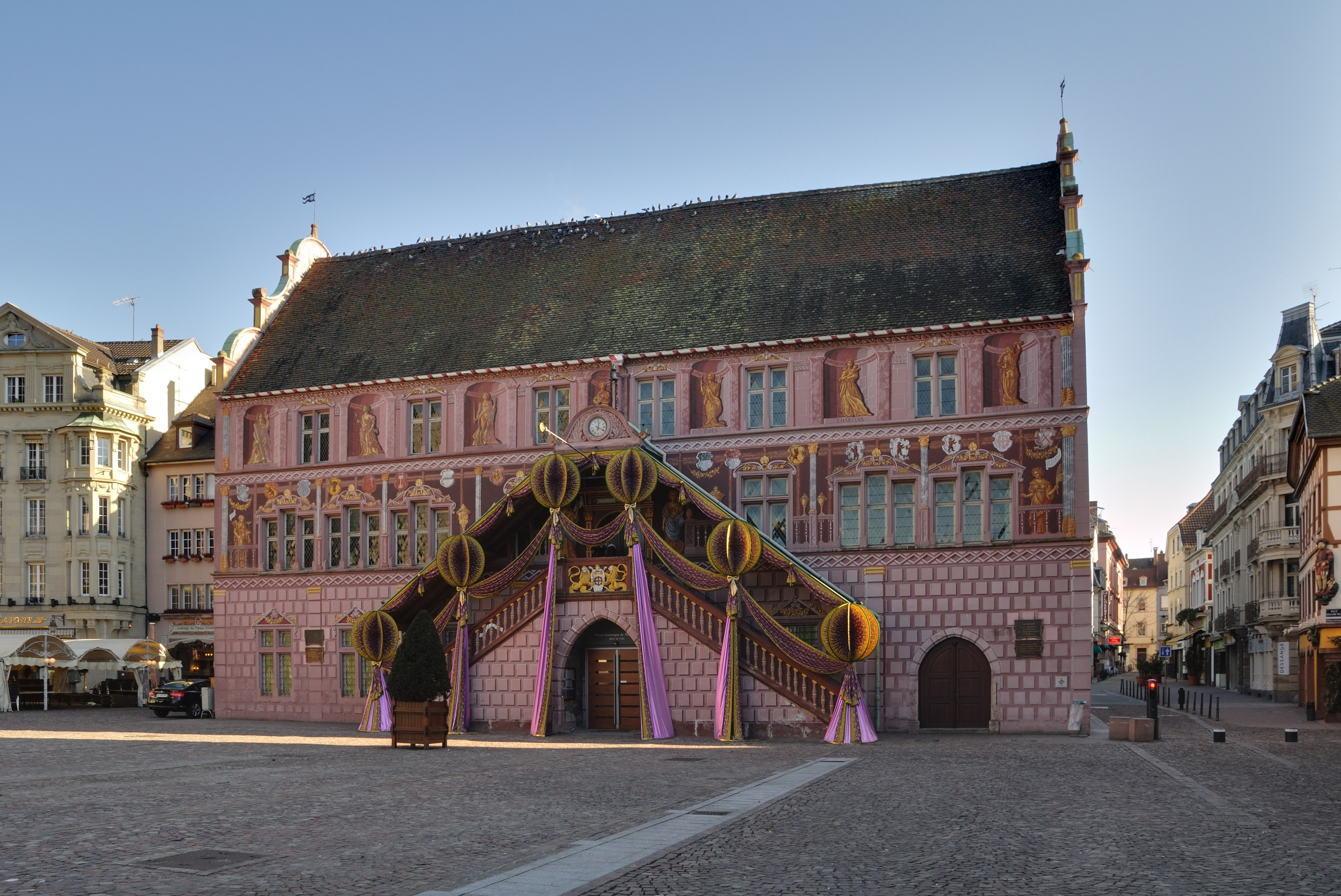
- The main frontage of the Hôtel de Ville in January 2010

General information
- Type: City hall
- Architectural style: Northern Renaissance style
- Location: Mulhouse, France
- Coordinates: 47.7466°N 7.3393°E
- Completed: 1553

Design and construction
- Architect: Michel Lynthumer

Monument historique
- Official name: Ancien hôtel de ville, actuellement Musée historique
- Type: Inscrit
- Designated: 1929
- Reference no.: PA00085528

The Hôtel de Ville (French pronunciation: [otɛl də vil], City Hall) is a municipal building in Mulhouse, Haut-Rhin, eastern France, standing on the Place de la Réunion. It was designated a monument historique by the French government in 1929.

== History ==
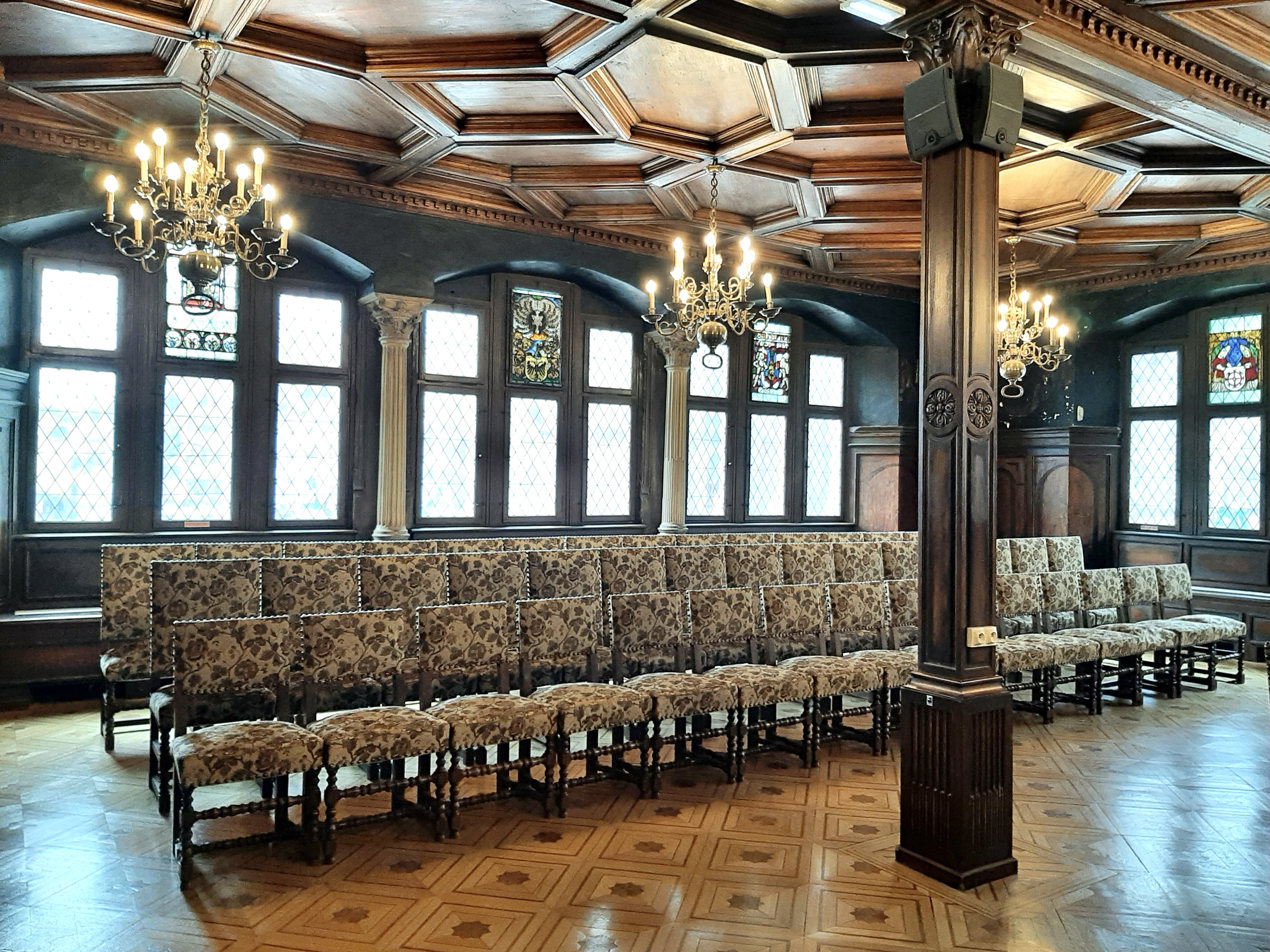
The Salle du Conseil (council chamber), looking west

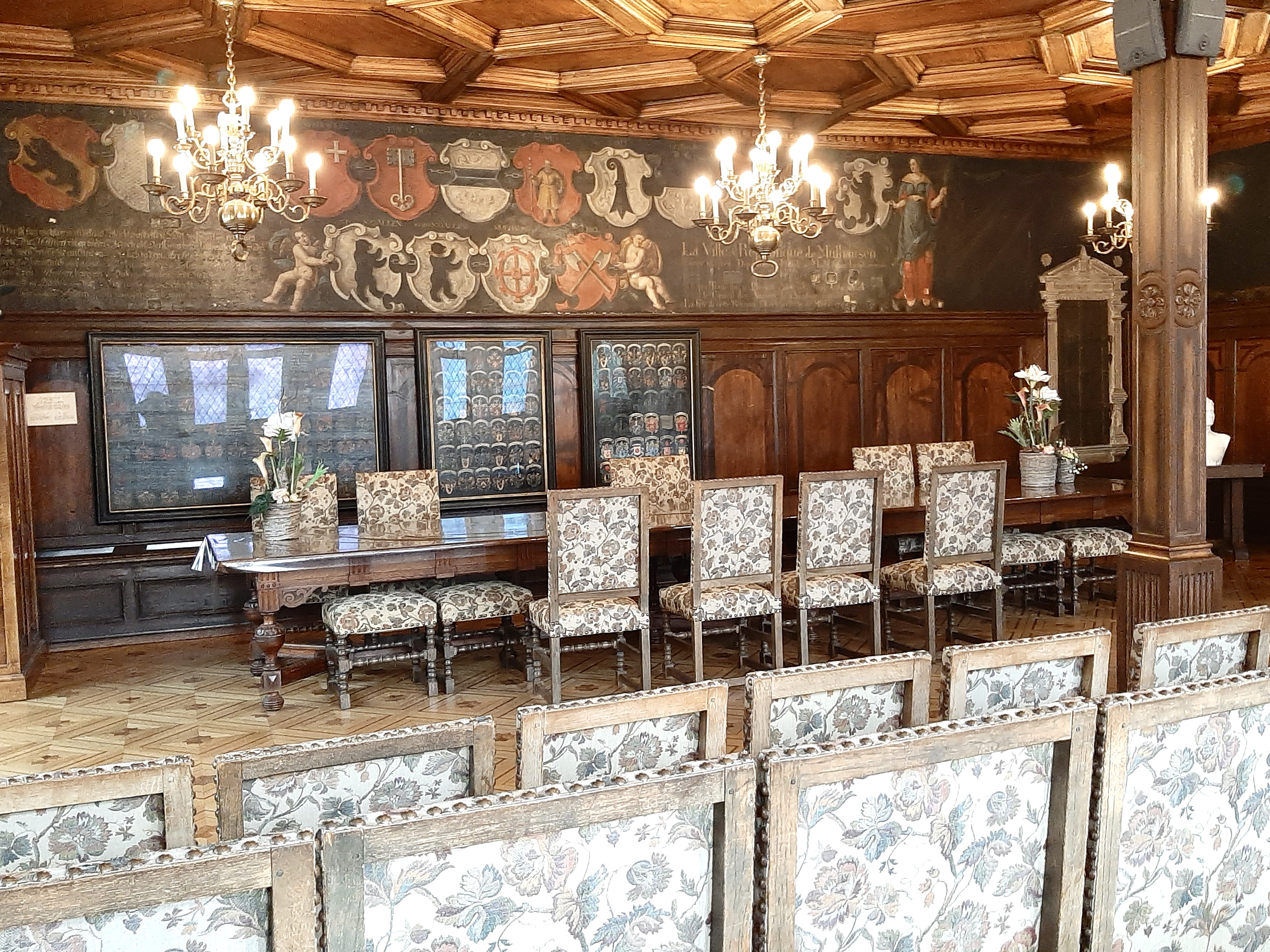
The Salle du Conseil, looking east

The first town hall was erected on the current site in 1432, at which time Mulhouse was a free imperial city within the Holy Roman Empire. After Mulhouse broke away from the Holy Roman Empire to join the Old Swiss Confederacy in 1515, the building served as the seat of government of the Republic of Mulhouse. The building was destroyed by a major fire in January 1551.

The council immediately set about commissioning a new building on the same site. It was designed and built by a mason from Basel, Michel Lynthumer, in the Northern Renaissance style, and was completed in 1553. The design initially involved a two-storey building facing west onto the City Square (now known as the Place de la Réunion). It featured a large forestair in a position slightly to the right of centre and was fenestrated, on the first floor, by tripartite windows. It was also elaborately painted in red and gold. Internally, the principal room was the Salle du Conseil (council chamber) on the first floor. The essayist and travel writer, Michel de Montaigne, described it as "un palais magnifique et tout doré" (a magnificent palace and all golden) in his essay "Voyage à travers l'Europe".

The artist, Jean-Gabriel, painted a series of trompe-l'œil frescos on the sides of the building, based on engravings by Henri Goltzius, in 1698. In 1779, the expansion of the building by an extra storey created a canvas for additional decorations, including a series of painted niches containing painted statues created by Théodore-André Genderich.

Following the French Revolution, the council agreed to dissolve the Republic of Mulhouse and a treaty documenting the annexation of Mulhouse by France was proclaimed on the forestair of the building in March 1798.

The Musée historique de Mulhouse opened on the second floor of the building in 1864. One of the exhibits added to the collection in the museum was the "Die Klapperstein" (the chatter stone) which was worn round their neck by slanderers, accused of malevolent chatter, as they walked through the city and were pelted with rocks as punishment.

Following the liberation of the town by the French 1st Armored Division under the command of General Jean Touzet du Vigier on 21 November 1944, during the Second World War, the chairman of the Provisional Government, Charles de Gaulle, visited the building and gave a speech from the balcony on 10 February 1945. De Gaulle returned as president of France, and spoke from the balcony again on 19 November 1959, and another president of France, Valéry Giscard d'Estaing, did the same on 14 May 1979.
