= Musée historique de Mulhouse =

History and archaeology museum in Alsace, France

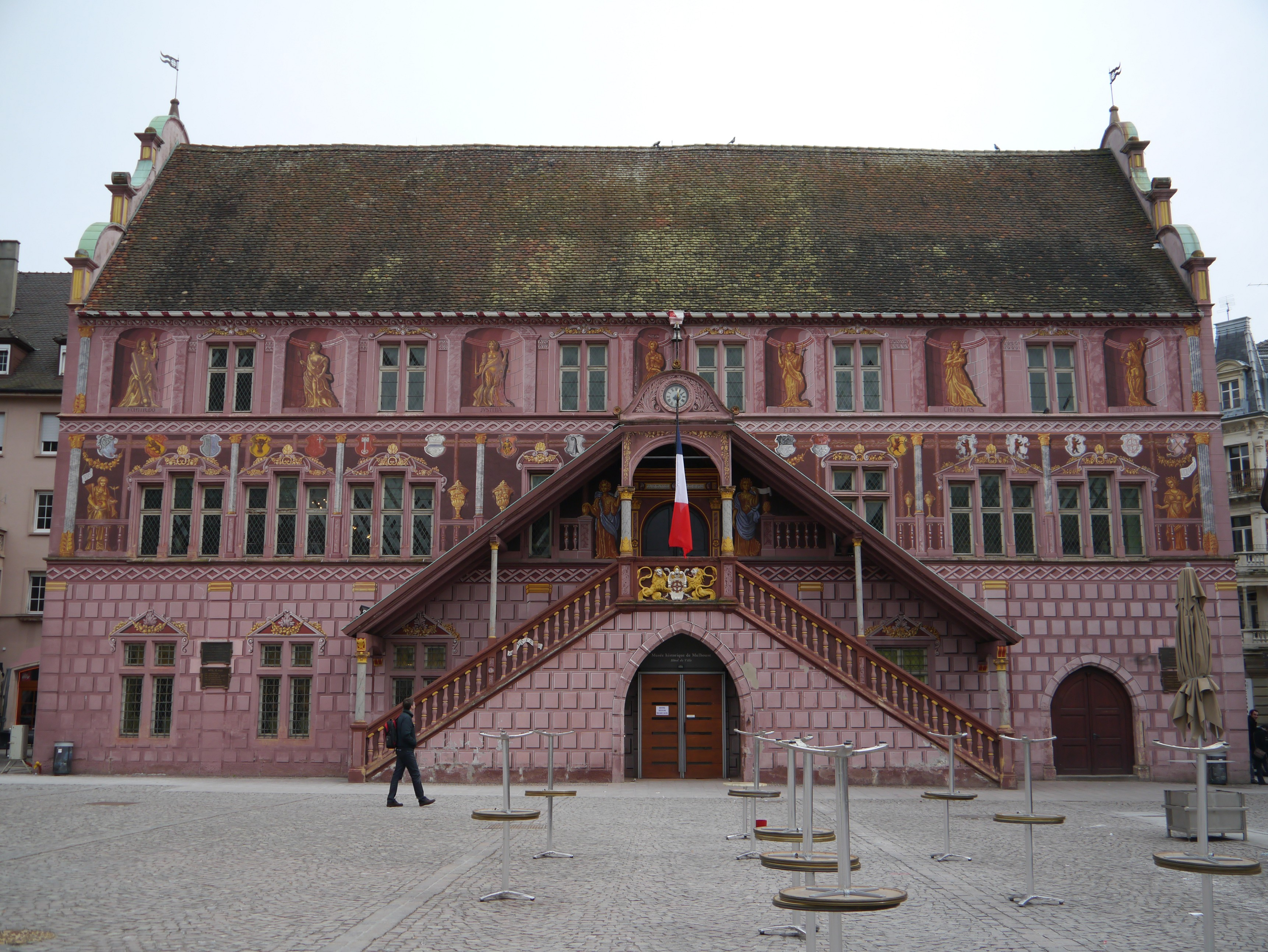
- Façade of the Old Town Hall with the main entrance of the museum
- Interactive fullscreen map
- Established: 1874
- Location: Hôtel de ville, Place de la Réunion; 68100 Mulhouse
- Coordinates: 47°45′N 7°20′E
- Type: History museum; Archaeology museum
- Accreditation: Museum of France
- Director: Joël Delaine
- Public transit access: Mulhouse tramway Line 1, stop République
- Website: historique.musees-mulhouse.fr

The Musée historique de Mulhouse is a municipal history museum and archaeology museum in Mulhouse, France.

It is housed since 1969 in Mulhouse's Old Town Hall, a Northern Renaissance building dating mainly from 1552, which is protected as a Monument historique since 1929.

The interiors of the Old Town Hall with their intact original decoration are an integral part of the museum. The museum's medieval sculptures are on display in the neighbouring Museum of Fine Arts, such as a Saint George Slaying the Dragon from 1490, originally from Tyrol. That work, as well as many others, is on permanent loan to the municipal collections of Mulhouse by the Société industrielle de Mulhouse (SIM), a learned society established in 1826 by local industrialists such as Dollfus, Koechlin, and Schlumberger which had begun collecting artworks in 1831.

== Gallery ==
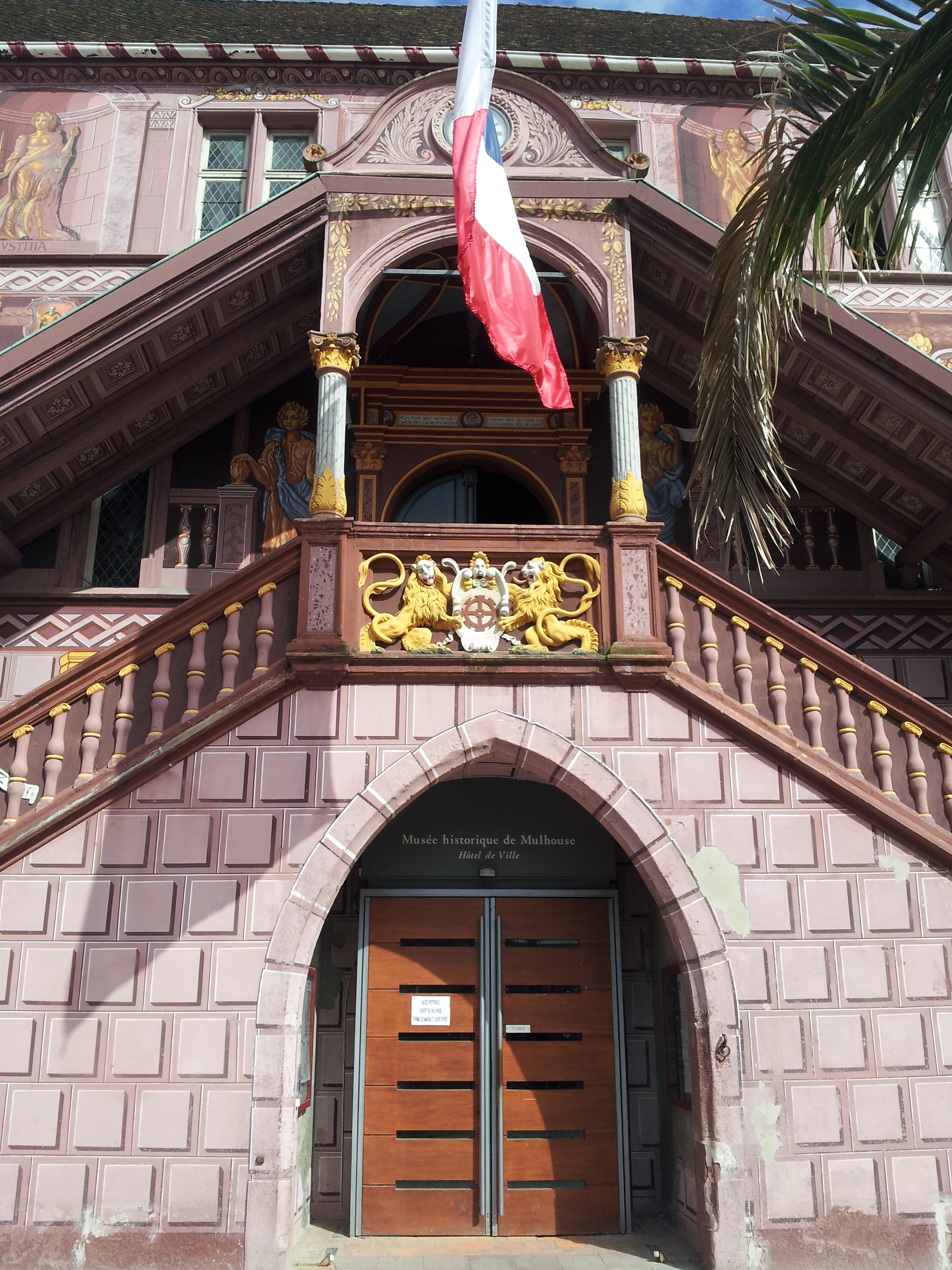
Entrance of the museum

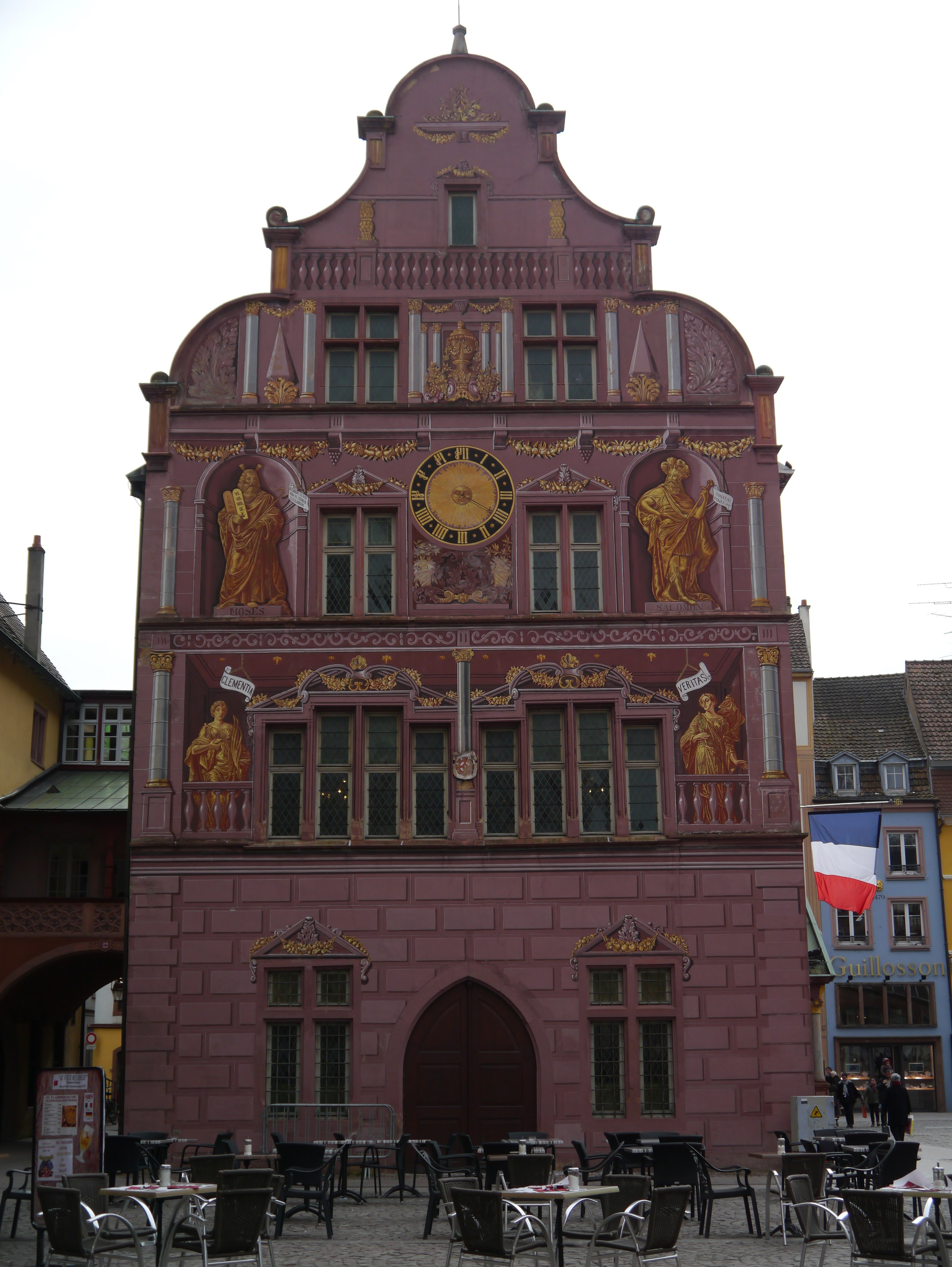
Lateral view of the Old Town Hall

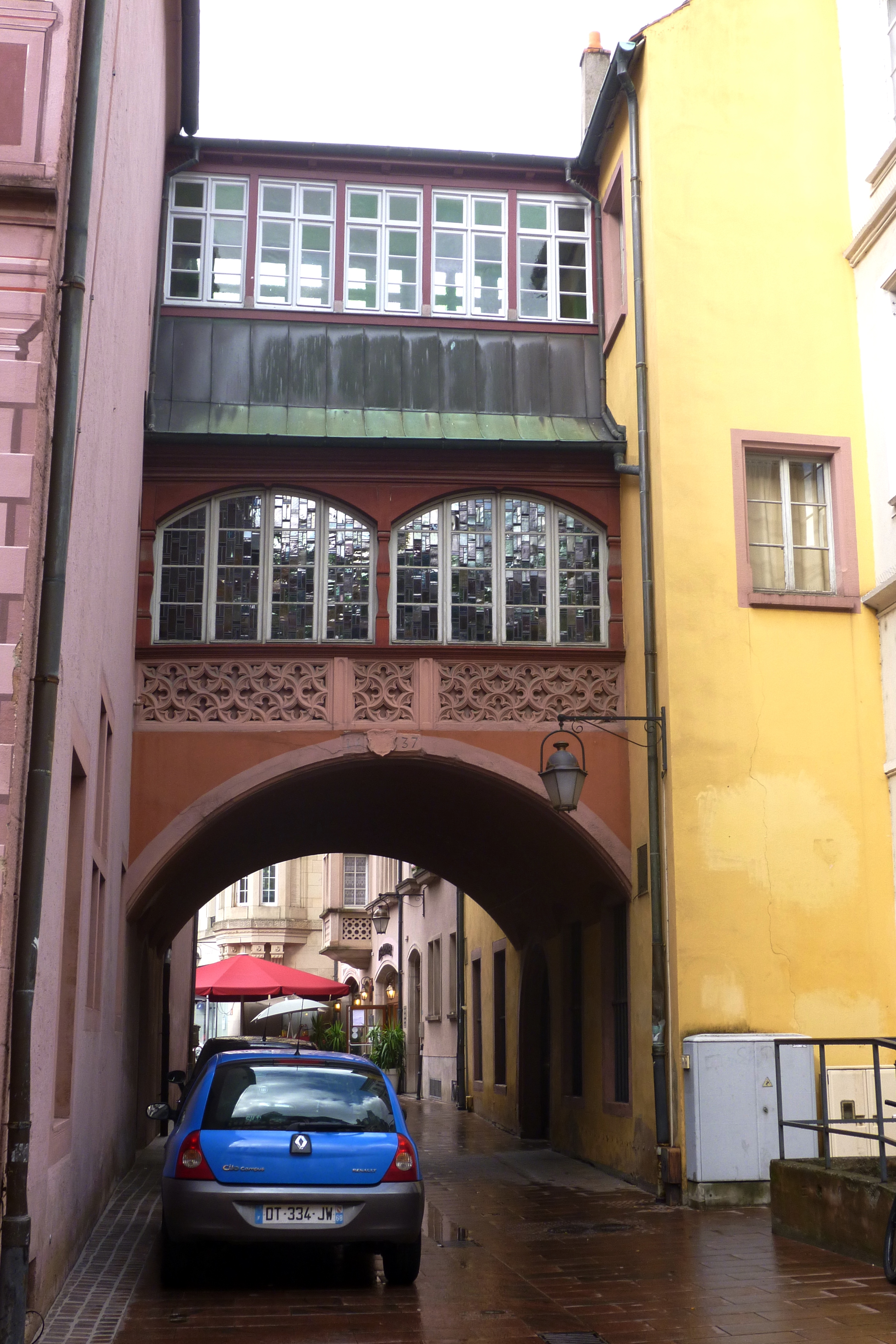
Passageway between the Old Town Hall and the annex

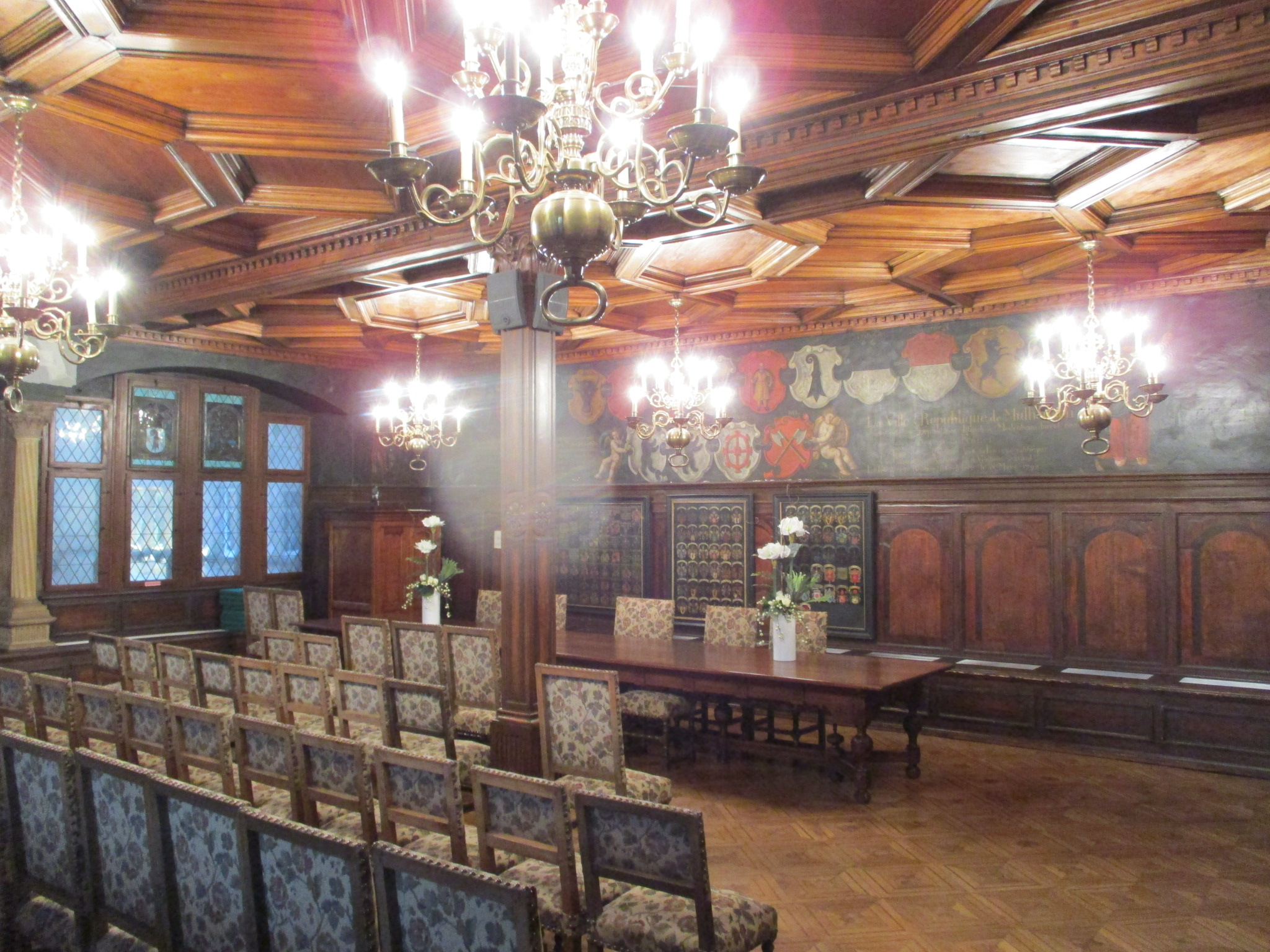
Renaissance assembly room

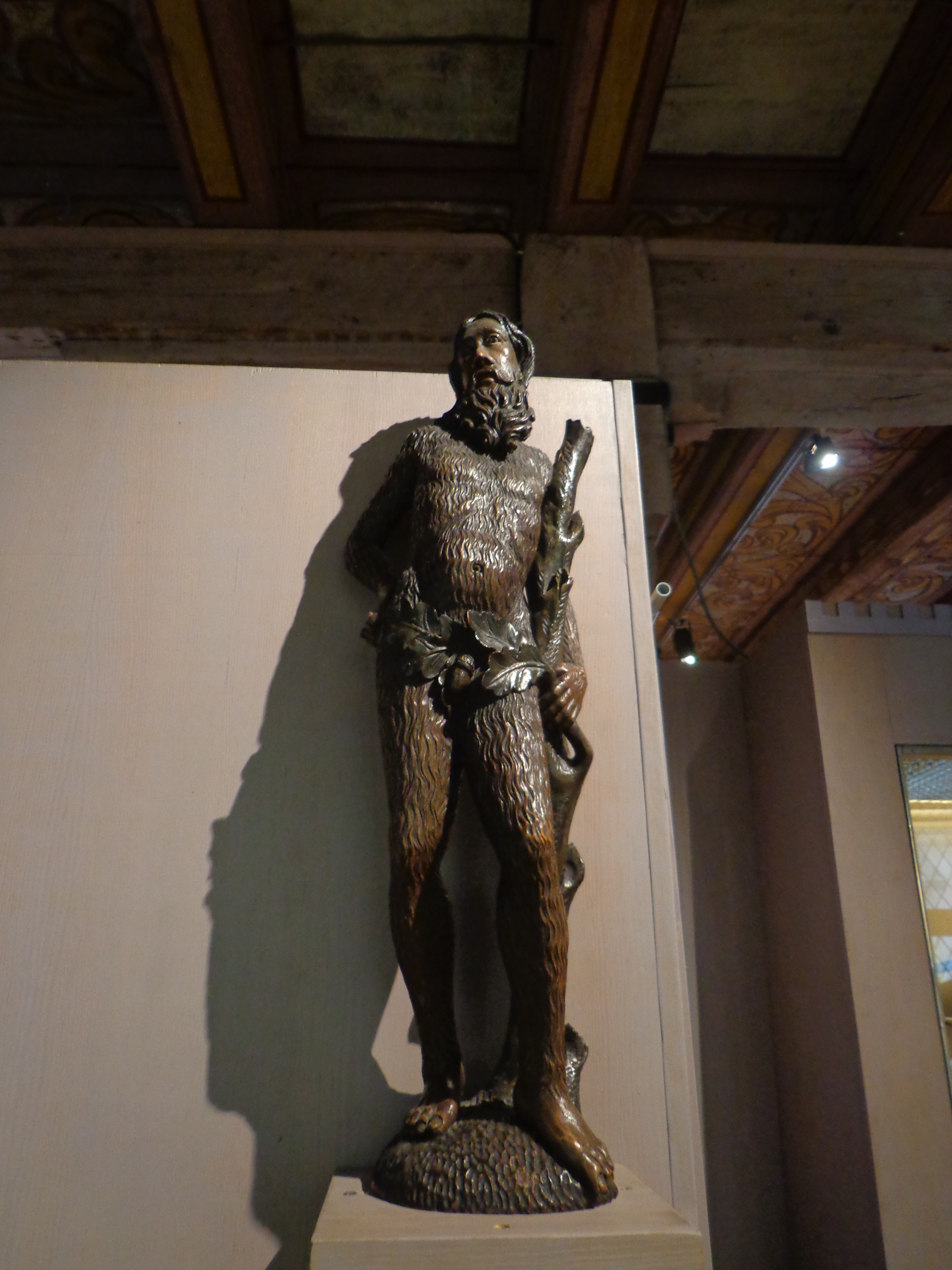
Statue of the "Wild Man" (17th century)

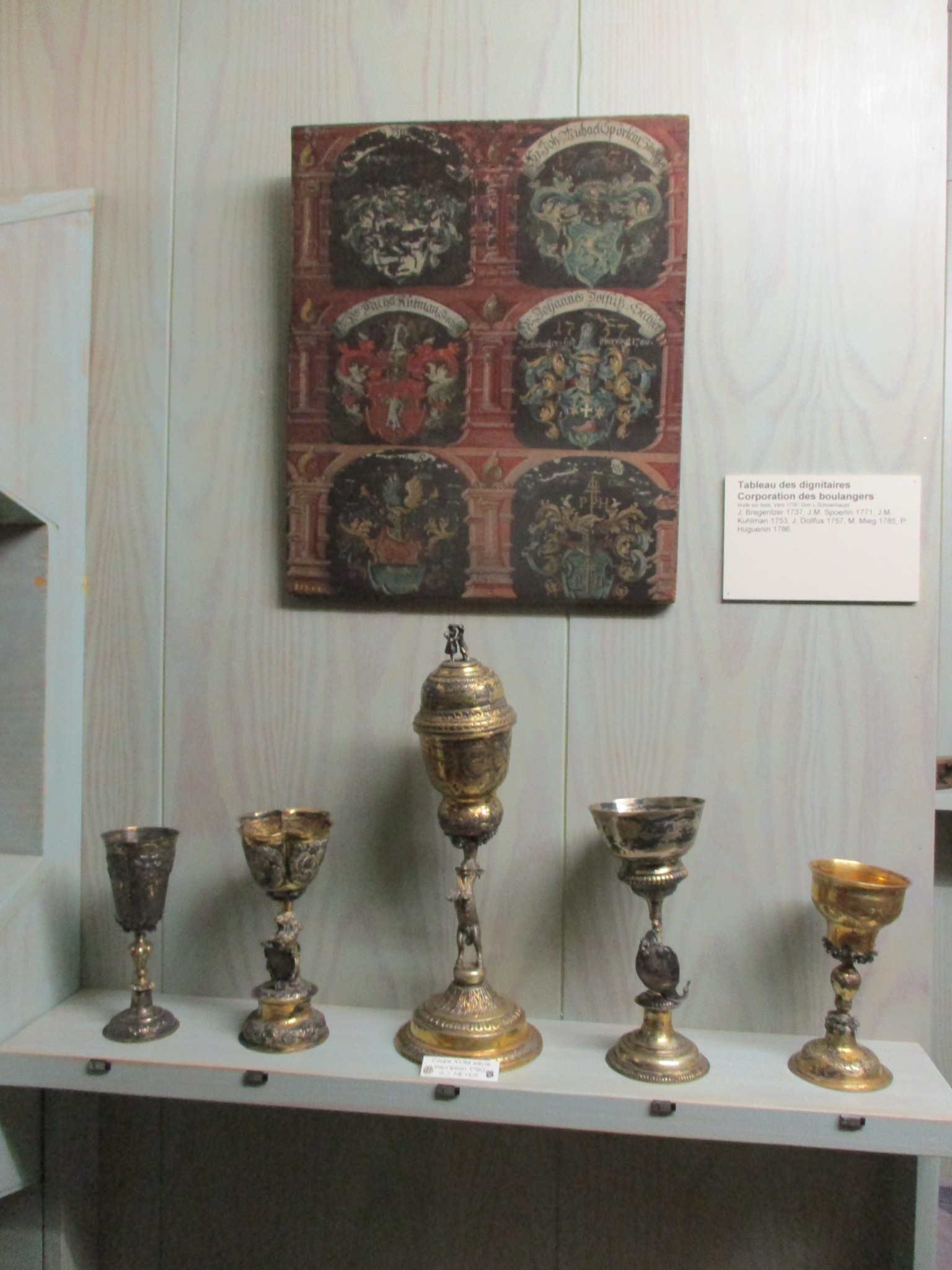
Coats of arms, cups and hanaps of corporations

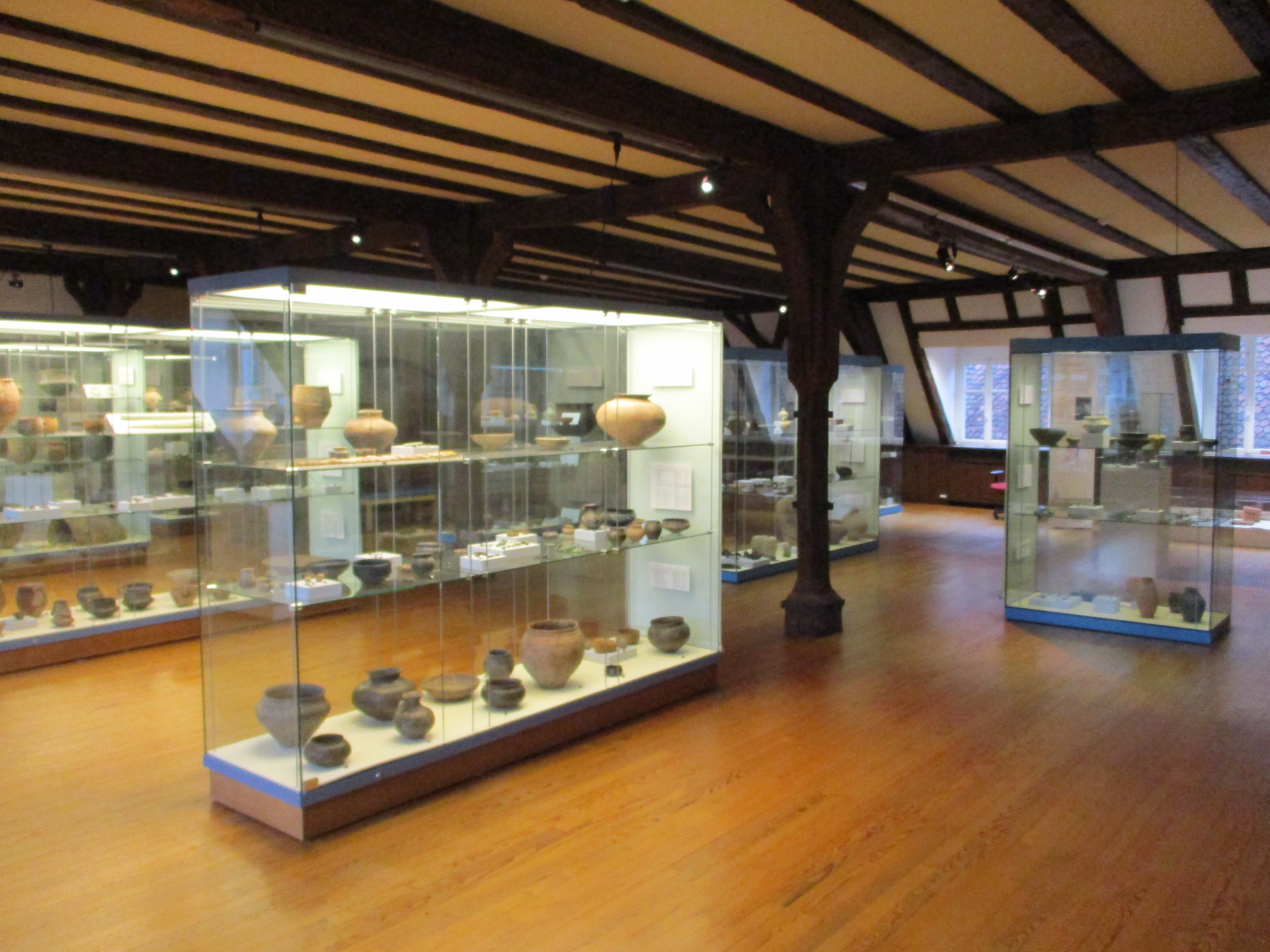
Archaeology section

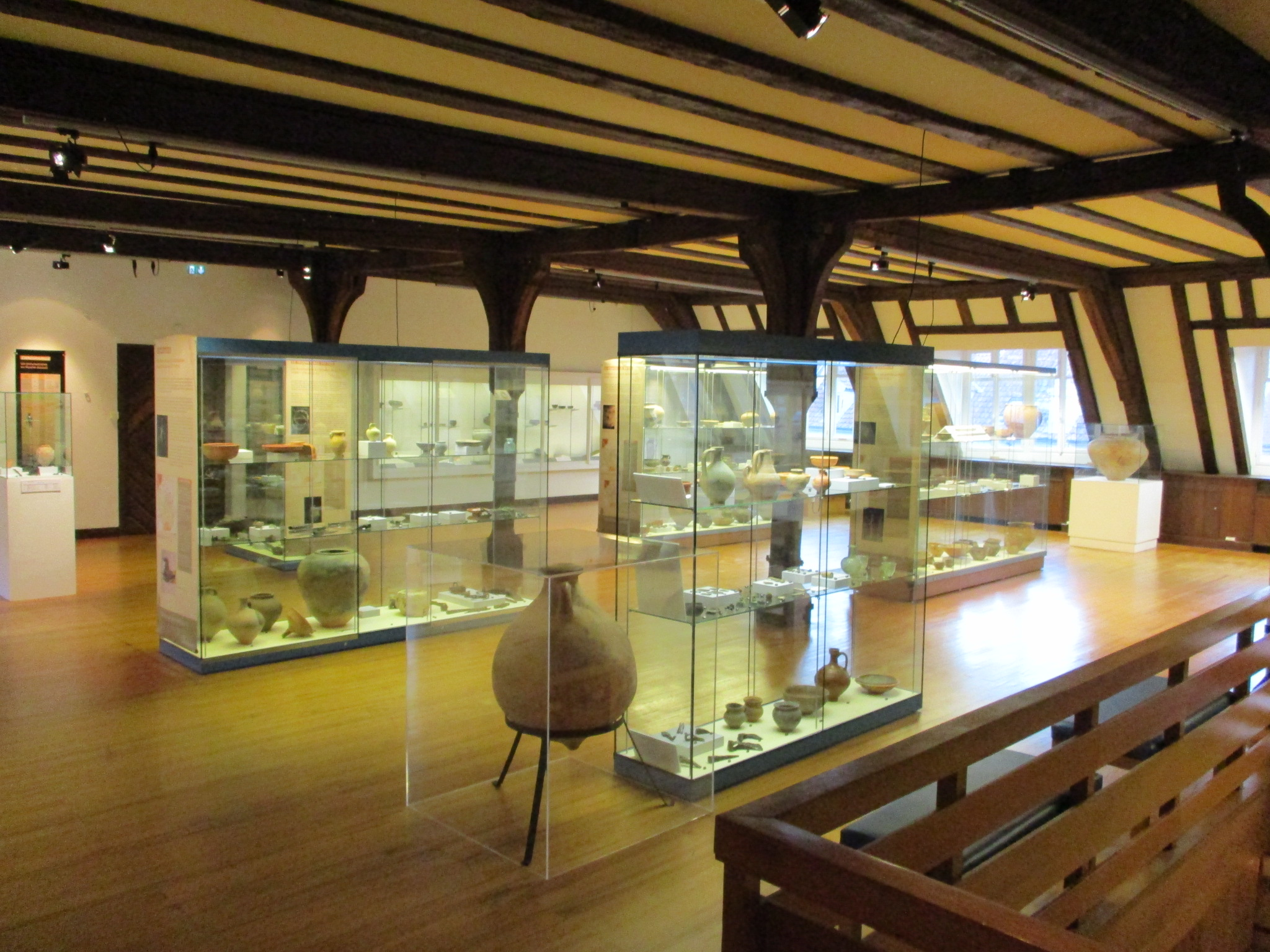
Archaeology section
