= Republic of Mulhouse =

State within the Old Swiss Confederation (1515–1798)

The Republic of Mulhouse (German: Stadtrepublik Mülhausen) was a Protestant associate of the Old Swiss Confederation in what is now eastern France.

Mulhouse had been a free imperial city of the Holy Roman Empire since 1275. It became a republic in 1347, with the election of its first burgomaster, Hans von Dornach. Mulhouse gained complete autonomy in 1395, which aroused the animosity of the surrounding nobility. Consequently, the city gradually severed its ties with the rest of Alsace and joined the Swiss confederates following the Six-Pence War, from which it emerged victorious.

From 1354 to 1515, Mulhouse was part of the Décapole, an association of ten free imperial cities in Alsace. The city formally broke away from the Holy Roman Empire and joined the Old Swiss Confederation as an associate in 1515. Therefore, it was not annexed by the France in the Peace of Westphalia in 1648, unlike the rest of the Sundgau. The Hôtel de Ville de Mulhouse served as the seat of government for the Republic of Mulhouse.

As a Swiss enclave in Alsace, it was a free and independent Calvinist republic, known as Stadtrepublik Mülhausen, associated with the Swiss Confederation until, following a vote by its citizens on 4 January 1798, it became part of France through the Treaty of Mulhouse, signed on 28 January 1798, during the Directory period of the French Revolution and following the declaration of war on Switzerland.
