= Lucien Vogt =

French painter

- Born: 28 February 1891; New York, United States
- Died: 1968 (aged 77)
- Known for: Painting

Lucien Vogt (1891 in New York City – 1968), was an American painter and illustrator.

== Biography ==
Lucien Vogt was born in New York City on 28 February 1891, of Alsatian extraction, his parents having emigrated to America after 1860 together with thousands of others escaping in Alsace. But some time before 1904 Vogt had returned to his family's roots, living in Soultz, in Haut-Rhin, and then in Mulhouse from 1904 to 1910. His initial art studies were probably undertaken in Mulhouse's only specialised school, the École de Dessin et d’Art Industriel, founded to provide the flourishing local textile industry with decorative designs and models. Later, he studied in Paris under François Flameng (1856–1923), both at the Académie des Beaux-Arts and at Flameng's studio, opened in 1905, where Henri Sollier was a fellow student.

=== Exhibitions at the Salons ===
In 1914 Vogt participated in his first Salon des Artistes Français, becoming a member in 1922. After an absence of six years Vogt then took part in the Salon des Artistes Français again in 1920 and 1922. His last submission, in 1924, was the Fauvist landscape, a composition that demonstrates the distance he had travelled since his first 1914 Salon. From then on, Vogt would submit work to the Parisian Salons more regularly. In 1926, at the Salon des Tuileries, he exhibited Femmes au bord de la mer, introducing – just this once – the life-size human figure into the landscape. Later in his career, the human figure would appear again, if only allusively, in the many views of Paris that he quickly sketched out in paint on small wood panels. It was in this format alone that he focused on bourgeois life, depicted in the emblematic setting of the capital's monuments and public parks.

=== Landscapes in Alsace and the Cévennes ===
Vogt periodically returned to Alsace, where he maintained a pied-à-terre in Mulhouse. From there he would roam the countryside, painting directly from nature the landscapes of his youth, the banks of the Ill, for instance, and the Vosges forest bordering Soultz. His early landscapes bring to mind those of another Alsatian artist, Jean-Jacques Henner, who showed his work at the Salon until 1903. This painter was himself very much attached to his native region, and renewed his inspiration through his contact with the rugged nature of Alsace.

The artist was especially aware of the seasons and climate. Thus he would often return to the same place, as he did in Anduze, a traditional Cévennes village, to paint the site in winter and summer. His favourite seasons are clearly autumn and spring, when nature displays her fieriest colours. Vogt excels in the shifts from brown to russet, for example in his treatment of Alsace's forests and in the intense greens that deck out the foliage of the poplars along the Bords du Loing (INV 2535), in the Seine-et-Marne. It was there that Vogt spent his final years as a painter. The study of the reflections of trees in water, one of his favourite motifs, inevitably recalls Impressionist precedents, such as Alfred Sisley, who remained faithful to Moret-sur-Loing and its peaceful, verdant countryside until his dying day. In the 1940s, Vogt took the paintings of Pierre Bonnard for his models, specifically those of the 1920s, which were painted on the French Riviera (fig. 8) and in Canet. From these Vogt borrowed the broad, loose brushstrokes that lend his landscapes of the Cévennes and Alpes-Maritimes their particular vibrancy.

=== Maturity ===
Between 1930 and 1940, Vogt developed an individual genre, the animated landscape, with works like La cour de ferme (fig. 9), or Les maisons Alsaciennes (INV 2022), a preliminary study of which is extant (fig. 10). Such paintings, exhibited both in the Paris Salons and the exhibitions of Mulhouse's Société des Arts, stand out thanks to his polychromatic palette. The uniform light, creating the paintings’ peaceful atmosphere, is consistent with contemporary painting, with its paring down of detail and simplification of form. In 1957 the Raymond Duncan Gallery in Paris mounted a retrospective of this painter ‘of luminous landscapes’, to use the words of the famous Alsatian illustrator and cartoonist Henri Zislin. Lucien Vogt died in 1968.

== Works in public institutions ==
- Paysage sous la neige. Musée des Beaux-Arts de Mulhouse, gift of Mrs Paul Schwartz 1973, n° inv. 73.3.4.

== Exhibitions ==
(non-exhaustive list)

- Lucien Vogt - 1957, Galerie Raymond Duncan, Paris
- French Naturalist Painters 1890-1950 - 12 June - 7 July 2012, The Fleming Collection, London
