= Marcel Rieder =

French painter (1862–1942)

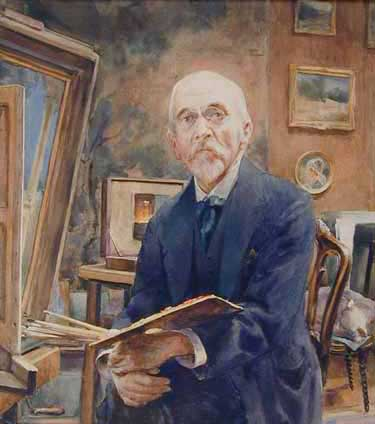
Marcel Rieder à l'atelier

Marcel Rieder (19 March 1862 – 30 March 1942) was a French painter.

He was born in Thann. Rieder came from a distinguished family in Alsace; his grandfather Jean Jacques Rieder (1778–1852) was a minister of the Temple Neuf Protestant church in Strasbourg. Marcel Rieder studied at the Ecole des Beaux-Arts in Paris. He became a member of the Société des Artistes Français in 1894, and exhibited almost every year until 1939 in the "Salon de Paris".

Rieder married Marie Poiriault on 25 June 1903. Their son, Jean, was born in August 1906.

Rieder's painting style remained realistic throughout his life. He was initially influenced by the Symbolists, as evidenced in his painting Dante pleurant Béatrice (Dante weeping for Beatrice), now in the Musée de Mulhouse. From 1894 his style changed, and Rieder's paintings became notable for their peaceful and intimate interior scenes of rooms lit by oil lamps or electric lighting. He also painted twilight landscapes. As a member of the Société Bach of Paris Rieder came to know Albert Schweitzer. His portrait of the physician is shown in the museum dedicated to Schweitzer.

A painting by Rieder, Jours Heureux, was included in an exhibition staged at the Walker Art Gallery, Liverpool in the autumn of 1907. It featured in a room highlighting the work of overseas artists and was described by an anonymous columnist in the Manchester Courier as having "beautiful colour rendering".

Rieder spent most of his life in Paris, but in 1927 he retired to Busseu near Fontainebleau. In later life, Rieder joked that he had gone over to a "impressionistic" painting style, due to fading eyesight and tremors in his hands. He died in Villiers-sous-Grez on 30 March 1942.

Marcel Rieder's paintings

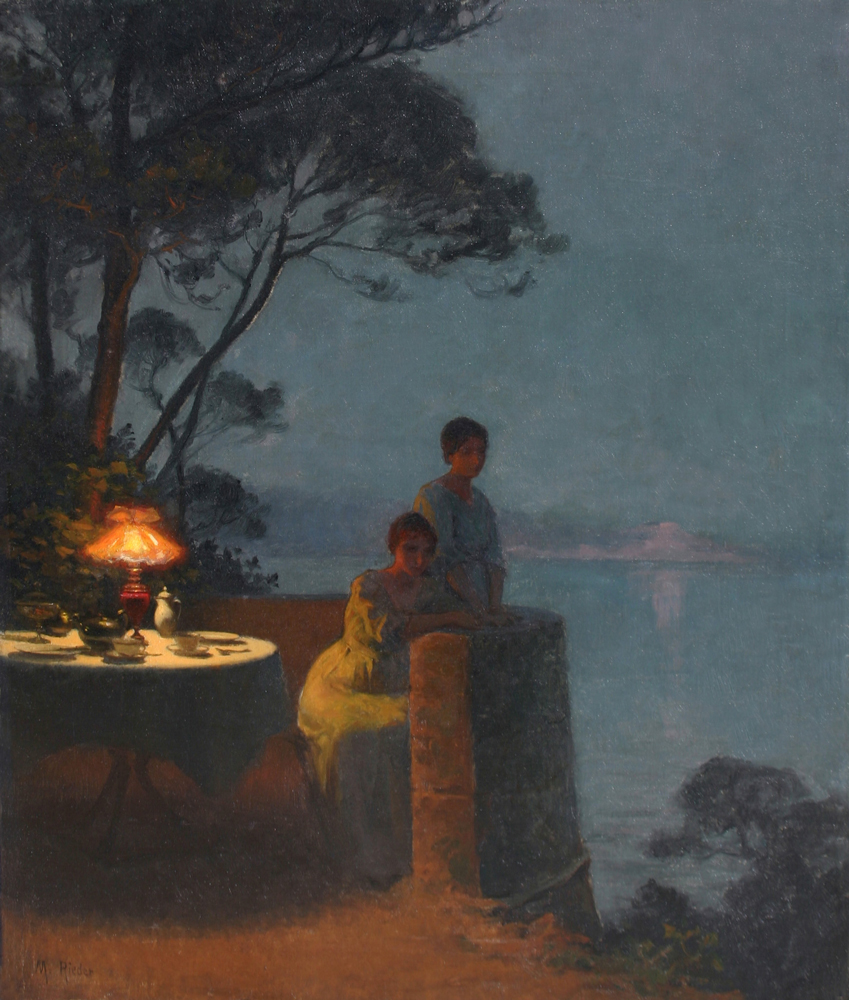
A vigil by the sea, Côte d'Azur

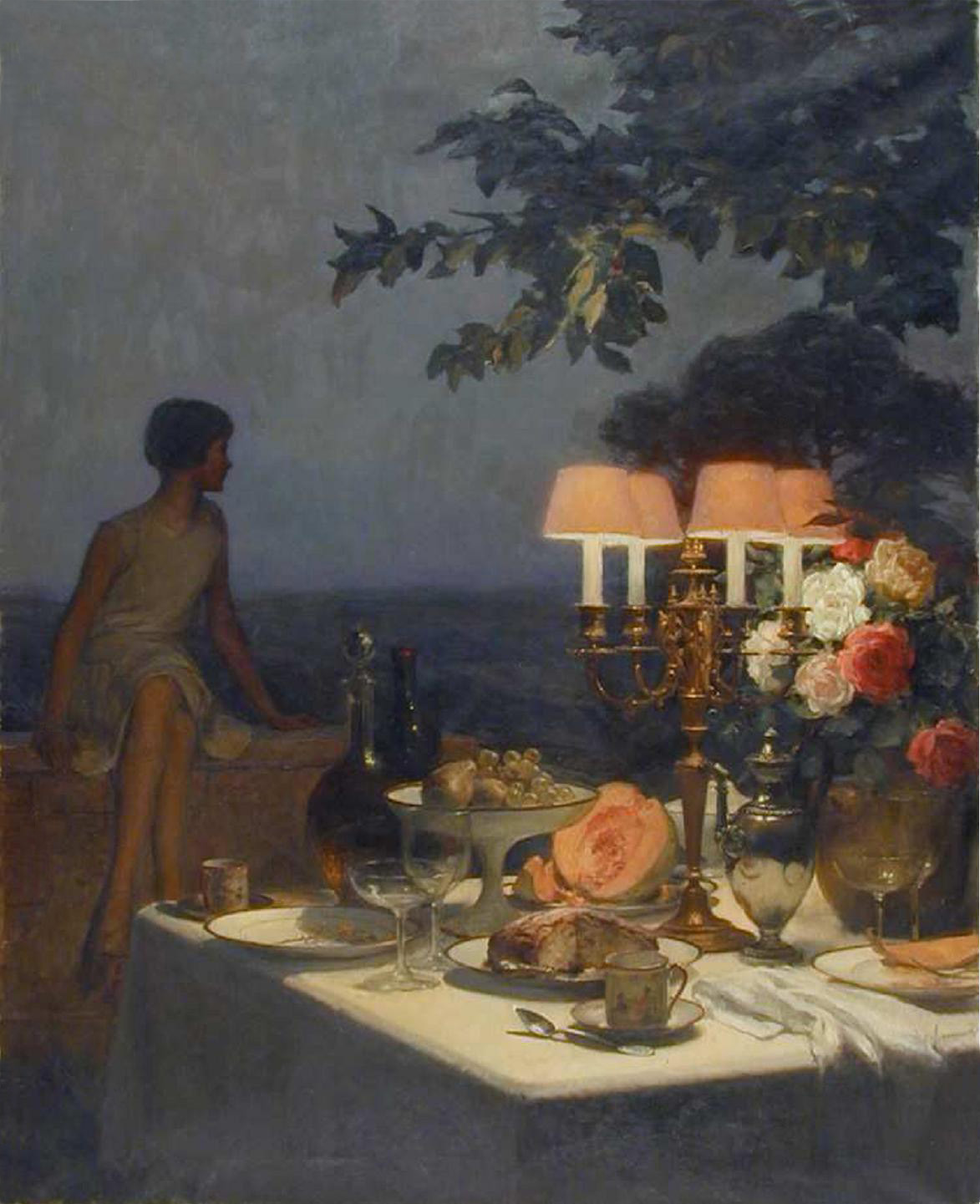
Romantic soirée

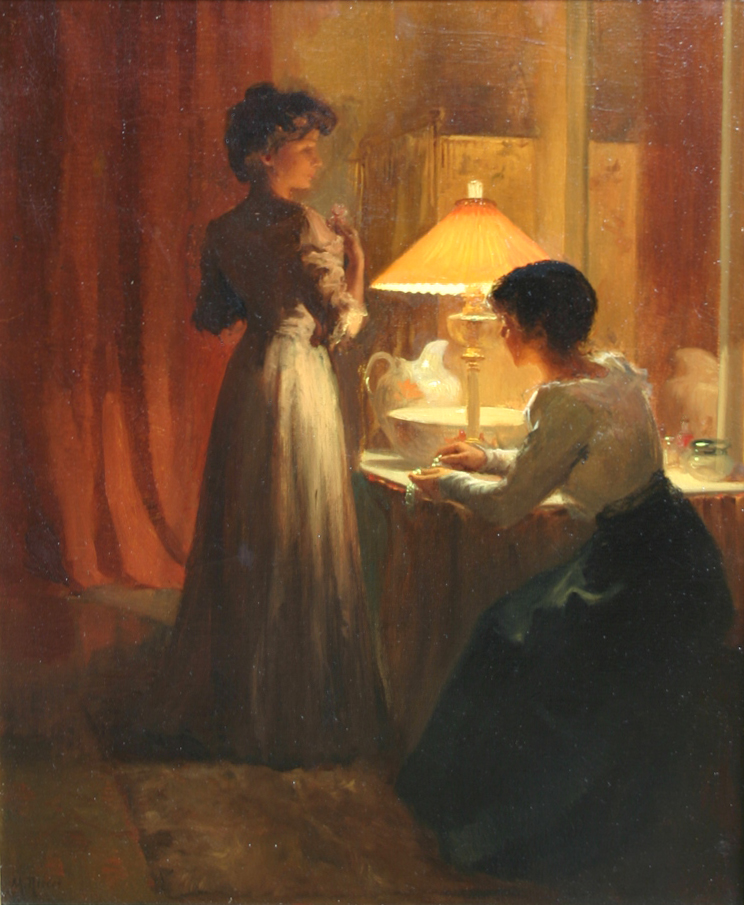
Choosing jewellery

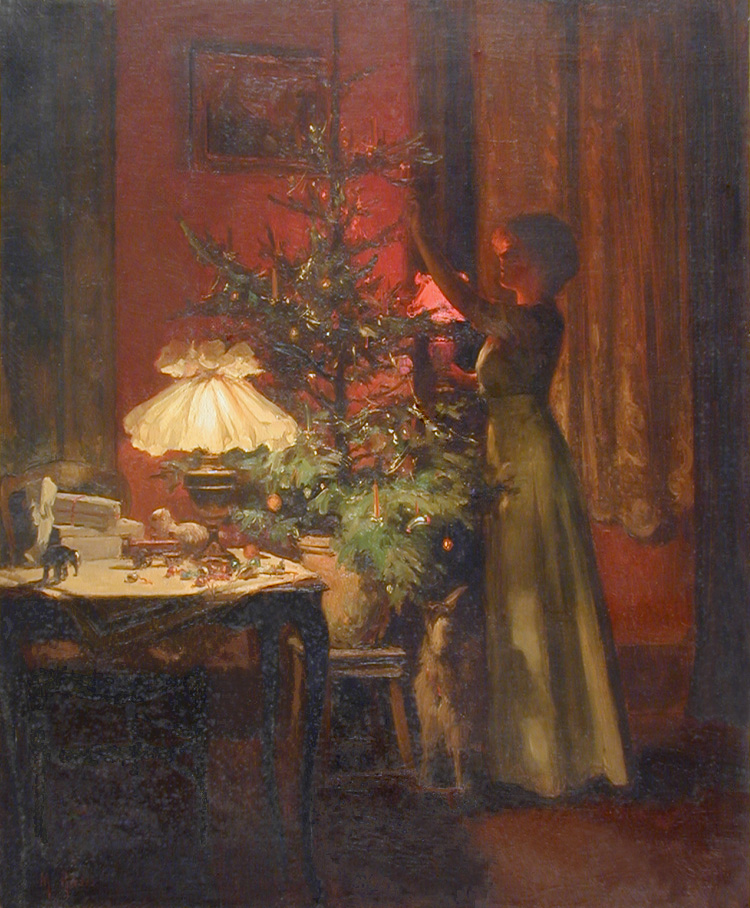
Decorating the Christmas tree

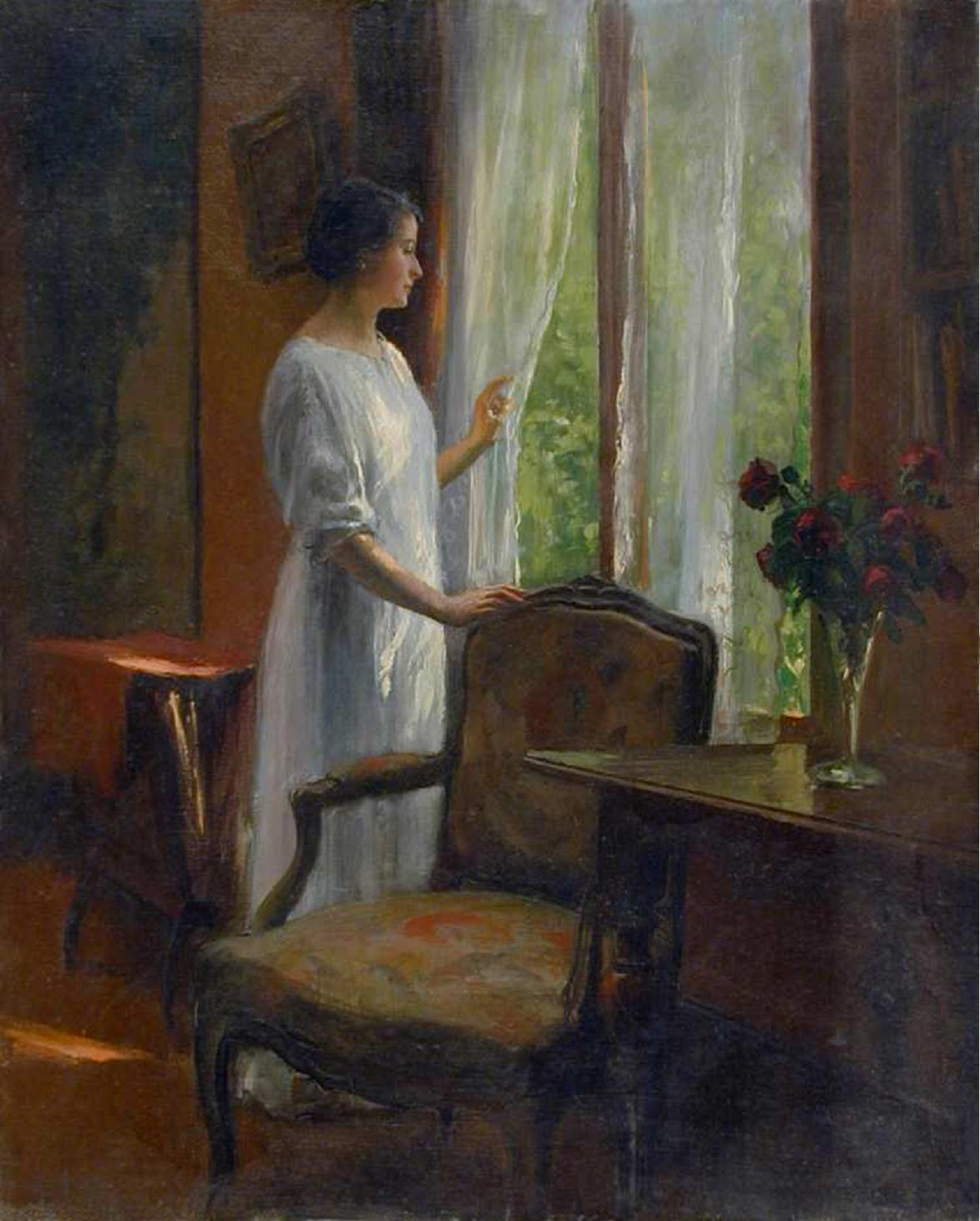
Waiting by the window

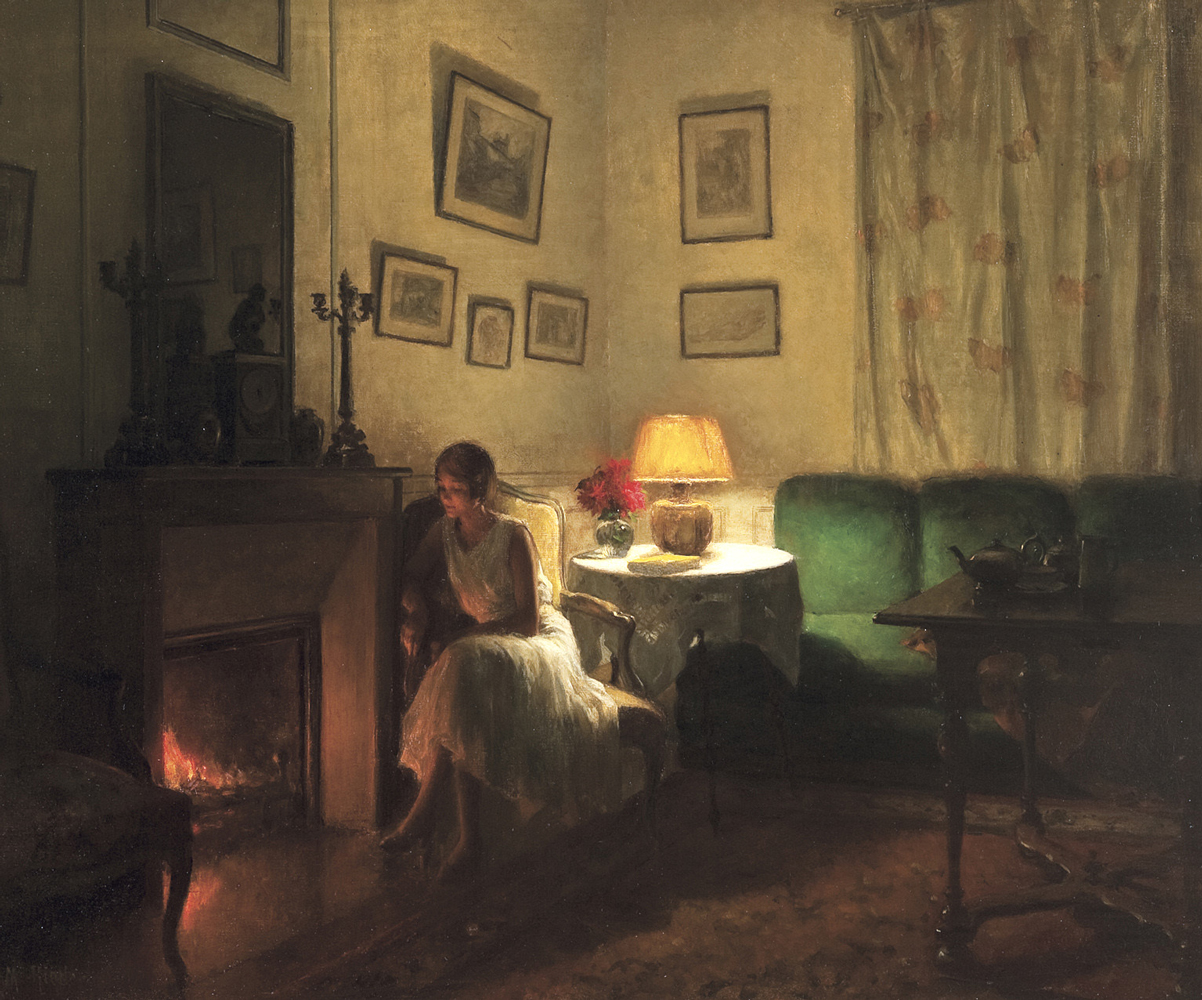
Songeuse devant la cheminée

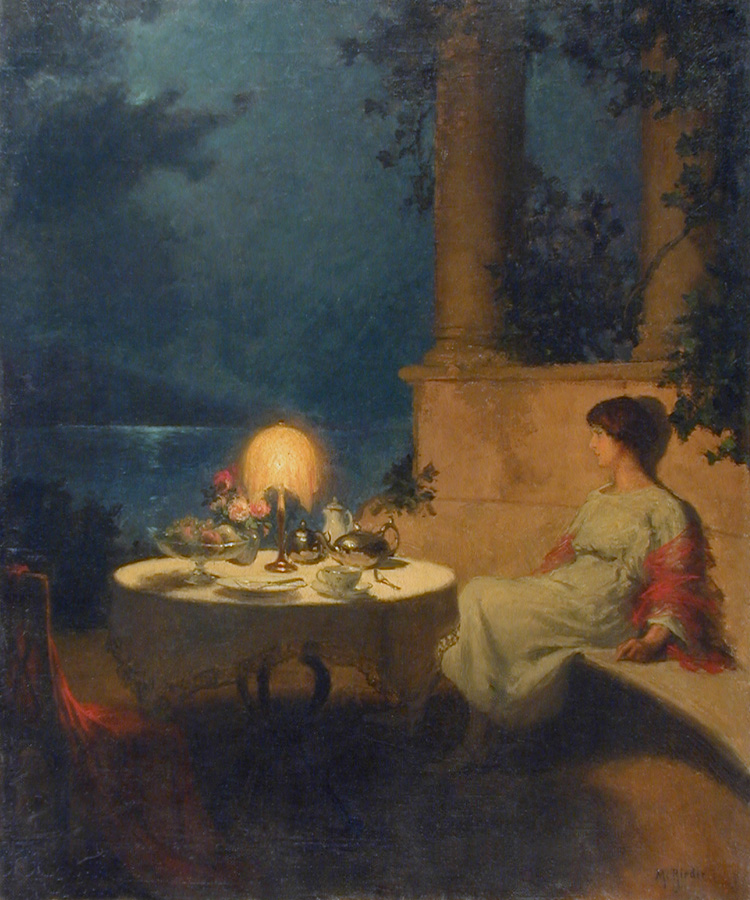
Solitude au bord du lac

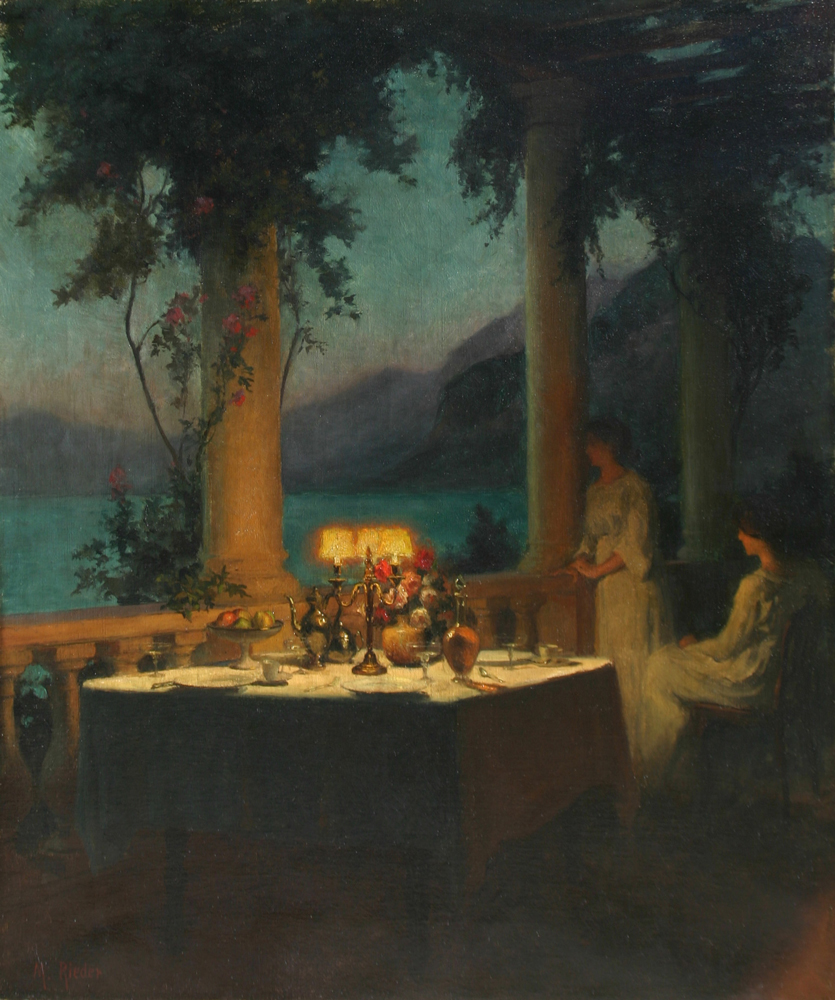
A revery by the lakeside, Lac d'Annecy
