= Entrance to a Forest =

Painting by Jacob van Ruisdael

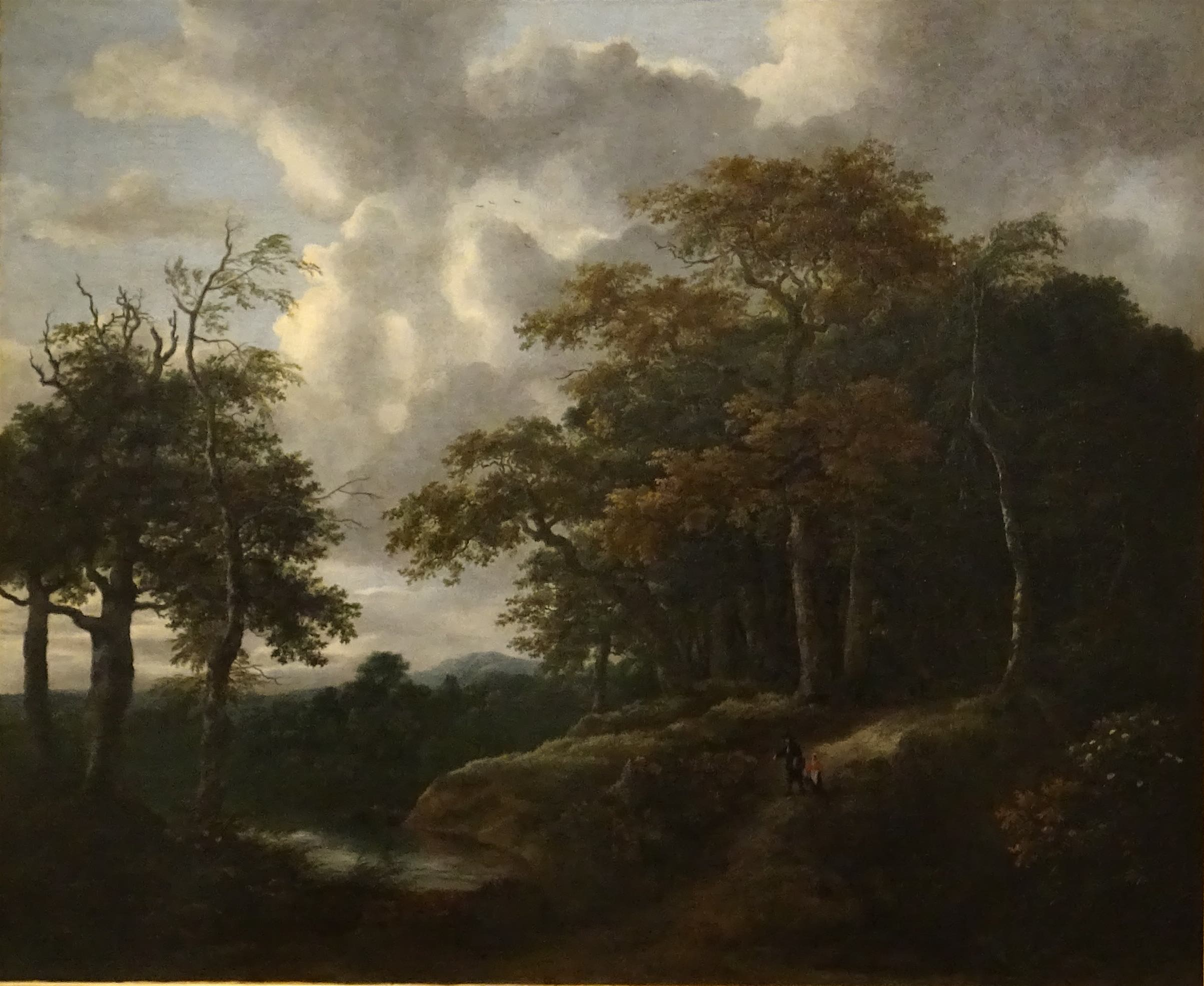
- Artist: Jacob van Ruisdael
- Year: between 1660 and 1665
- Medium: oil paint on canvas
- Movement: Dutch Golden Age painting Landscape painting
- Dimensions: 105 cm × 128 cm (41 in × 50 in)
- Location: Musée des Beaux-Arts, Mulhouse
- Accession: 1884

Entrance to a Forest is a 1660s landscape painting by the Dutch artist Jacob van Ruisdael. It today belongs to the Musée des Beaux-Arts of Mulhouse, France. Its inventory number is D.58.1.82.

The painting is catalogued as number 384 in the complete catalogue established by Seymour Slive in 2001. Slive describes it as "now obscured by dark, yellowed varnish and grime"; it has been cleaned up since.

== See also ==
- List of paintings by Jacob van Ruisdael
