= Camille Alfred Pabst =

French painter

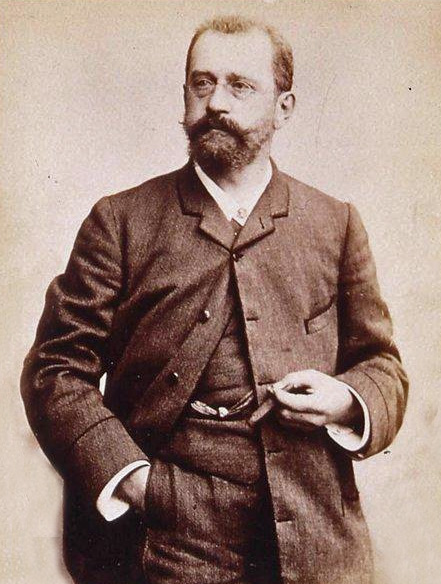
- Born: June 18, 1828; Heiteren
- Died: September 30, 1898 (aged 70); 17th arrondissement of Paris
- Occupation: Artist

Camille Alfred Pabst (June 18, 1828 – September 30, 1898) was a French painter.

After studying law in Strasbourg, he was at first a lawyer in Colmar, but left the bar to devote himself to painting. He trained with Pierre-Charles Comte in Paris and first exhibited at the Salon of 1865.

Considered a "painter of Alsace Folklore", Pabst painted the landscape of his native region, but also produced historical scenes and scenes of everyday life.

He is buried in the Colombarium of the Père-Lachaise cemetery in Paris.

== Gallery ==
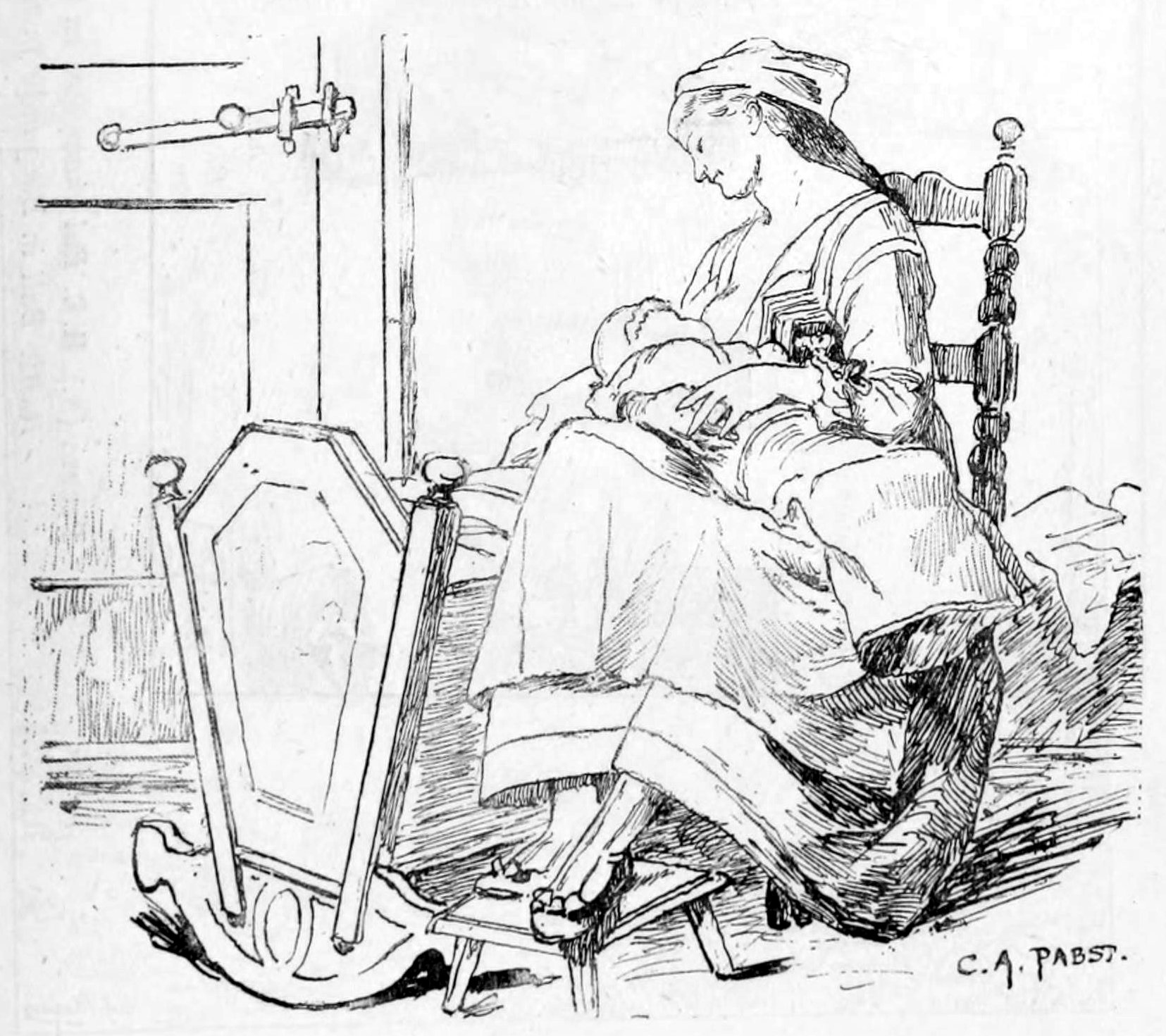
Jeune mère alsacienne (Salon de 1883)

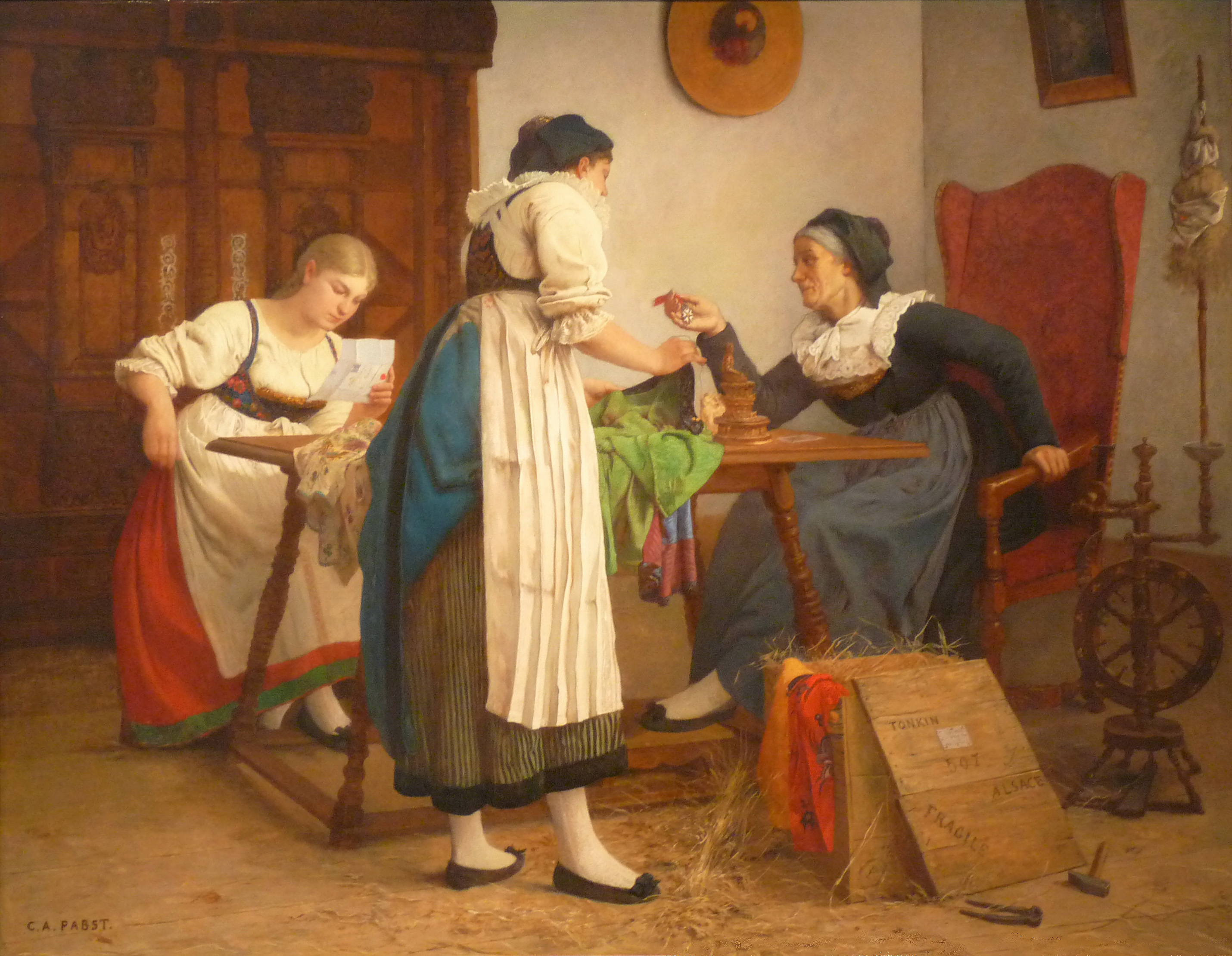
L'envoi du Tonkin (1885), Musée des Beaux-Arts de Mulhouse.

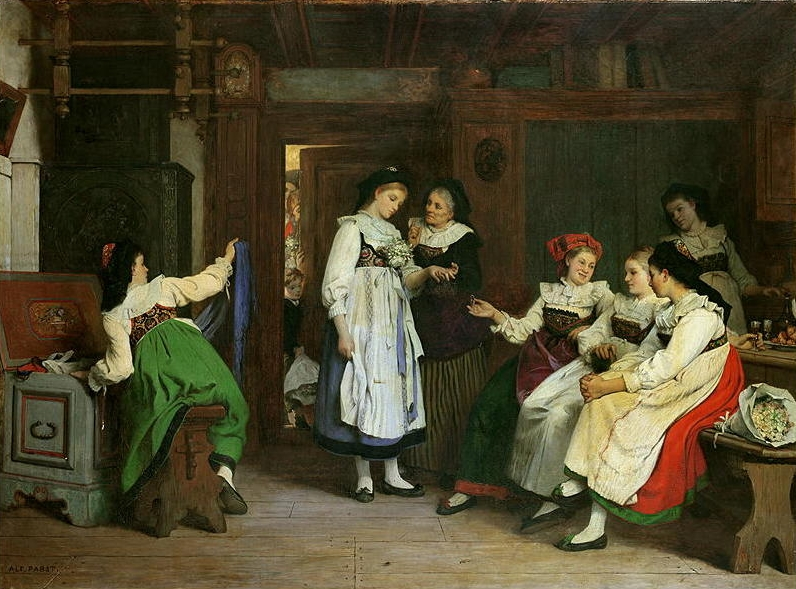
Une noce en Basse-Alsace, Musée Unterlinden, Colmar.
