= Flora and Zephyr =

Painting by William-Adolphe Bouguereau

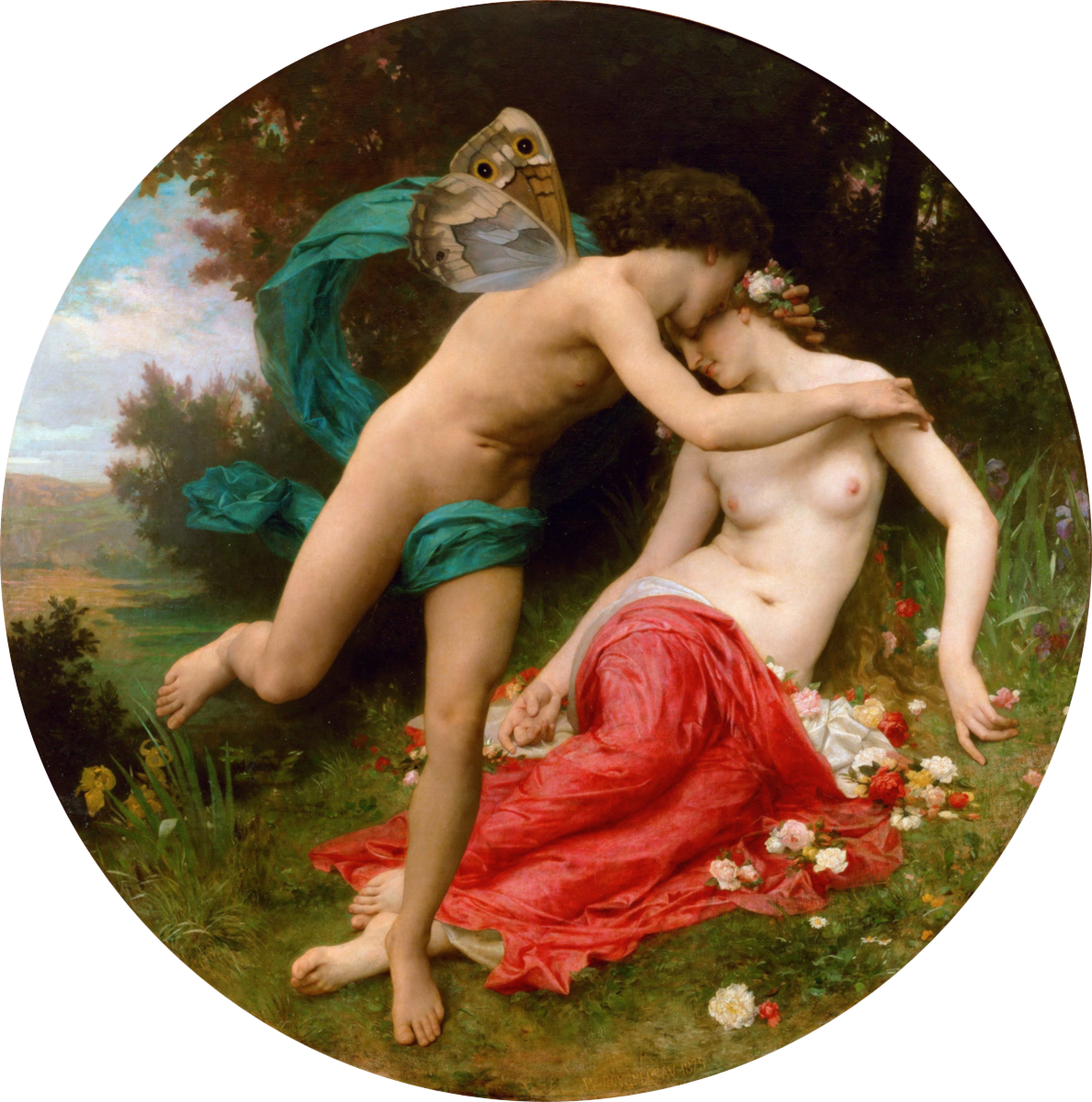
- Artist: William-Adolphe Bouguereau
- Year: 1875
- Medium: oil paint on canvas
- Movement: Academic art
- Subject: Flora and Zephyr
- Dimensions: 185 cm diameter (73 in)
- Location: Musée des Beaux-Arts, Mulhouse
- Accession: 1879

Flora and Zephyr (French: Flore et Zéphyr) is an 1875 oil-on-canvas painting by the French artist William-Adolphe Bouguereau. It is one of the most famous paintings of the Musée des Beaux-Arts of Mulhouse, France. Its inventory number is D.75.1.50.

The circular painting (tondo) depicts Zephyr, the Greek god of the west wind, gently kissing the Greek nymph Chloris, also known as her Roman equivalent Flora, the goddess of flowers. Zephyr has butterfly wings and is completely naked, save for a strategically placed blue veil. Flora's lower half is covered by a red drapery. The painter skilfully enhances the colour contrast not only of the cloths, but also of the complexions.

The painting was shown at the Paris Salon of 1875, then at the Mulhouse Salon of 1879, where it was bought for the collection of the Société industrielle de Mulhouse, from which the museum originated. In 2009, it was parodied by the Italian artist Filippo Panseca to display Prime Minister Silvio Berlusconi and his minister, Mara Carfagna. Instead of delicate butterfly wings, the male was depicted with huge owl wings, and his body was changed from slender to stocky. Apart from the head, the appearance of the female was not changed.
