= Musée des Beaux-Arts de Mulhouse =

Art museum in Alsace, France

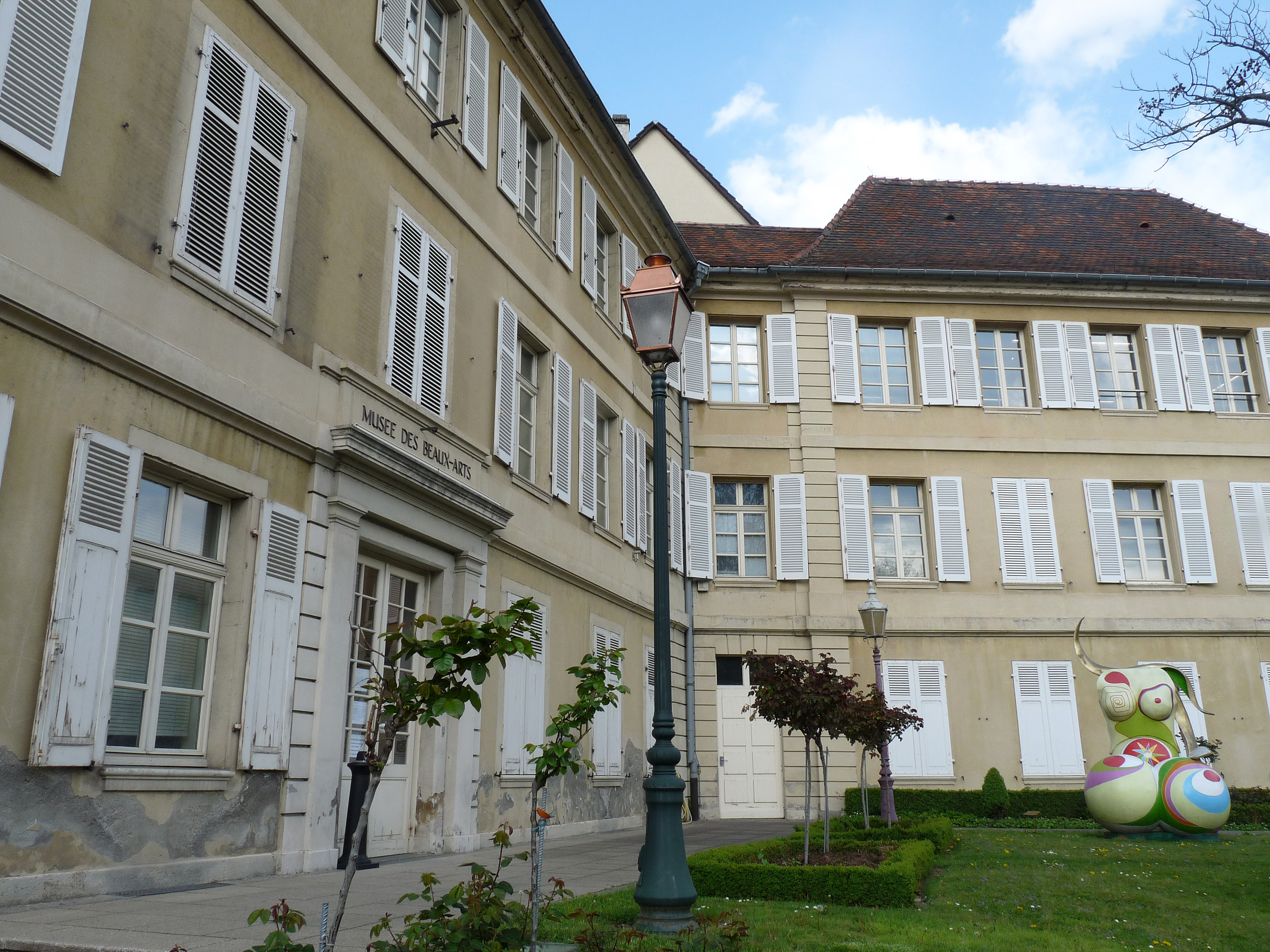
- Musée des Beaux-Arts main entrance
- Interactive fullscreen map
- Established: 1864
- Location: 4, place Guillaume Tell; 68100 Mulhouse
- Coordinates: 47°44′45″N 7°20′18″E
- Type: Art museum
- Accreditation: Museum of France
- Director: Joël Delaine
- Public transit access: Mulhouse tramway Line 1, stop République
- Website: beaux-arts.musees-mulhouse.fr

The Musée des Beaux-Arts de Mulhouse is a municipal art museum in Mulhouse, France. It originated with the Société industrielle de Mulhouse (SIM), a learned society established in 1826 by local industrialists such as Dollfus, Koechlin, and Schlumberger, which had begun collecting artworks in 1831, and was founded in 1864 by Frédéric Engel-Dollfus.

== The building ==
Since 1985, the museum is housed in a former hôtel particulier, the Villa Steinbach, which consists of a core from 1788 and a wing of 1924, added by the then owner, the SIM. Between 1883 and 1944, the museum had been housed in the monumental building now used for the Musée de l'impression sur étoffes.

== The collection ==
Due to the insufficient size of the current building only a small fraction of the ca. 1,000 paintings in the collection can be shown. Over half of the paintings still belong to the Société industrielle de Mulhouse and are on permanent loan to the museum. Many of the paintings belonging to the SIM were purchased at the Salon de Paris and, especially, at the Salon de Mulhouse, which took place 16 times between 1836 and 1912 (in 1899, Camille Pissarro, Claude Monet, and Pierre-Auguste Renoir participated in the Salon de Mulhouse with two paintings each, none of which was purchased by the SIM. Monet and Renoir did the same again in 1908, with the same result.)

The main focus of the collection is French art from (roughly) 1830 to 1930, with Alsatian painters active in France, such as Jean-Jacques Henner (of whom the museum owns 44 oil paintings), Jean Benner, Emmanuel Benner, Camille Alfred Pabst, Gustave Brion, Marcel Rieder, Henri Zuber, Charles Walch... sharing the walls with Courbet, Isabey, Boudin, Bonnat, Martin, Cormon, Clairin, Laurens, Hébert, Merson, Marquet, and many others. The museum also displays a small collection of old master paintings featuring artists from Italy (Sebastiano Ricci), the Dutch Republic (Jacob van Ruisdael), and Flanders (Pieter Brueghel the Younger, David Teniers the Younger) in addition to French masters (Hyacinthe Rigaud, François Boucher); a small collection of medieval Germanic paintings and sculptures (on loan from the Musée historique de Mulhouse); and post-WWII art, essentially from France (Aurélie Nemours).

== Gallery of notable works ==
See also: Paintings in the Musée des Beaux-Arts de Mulhouse

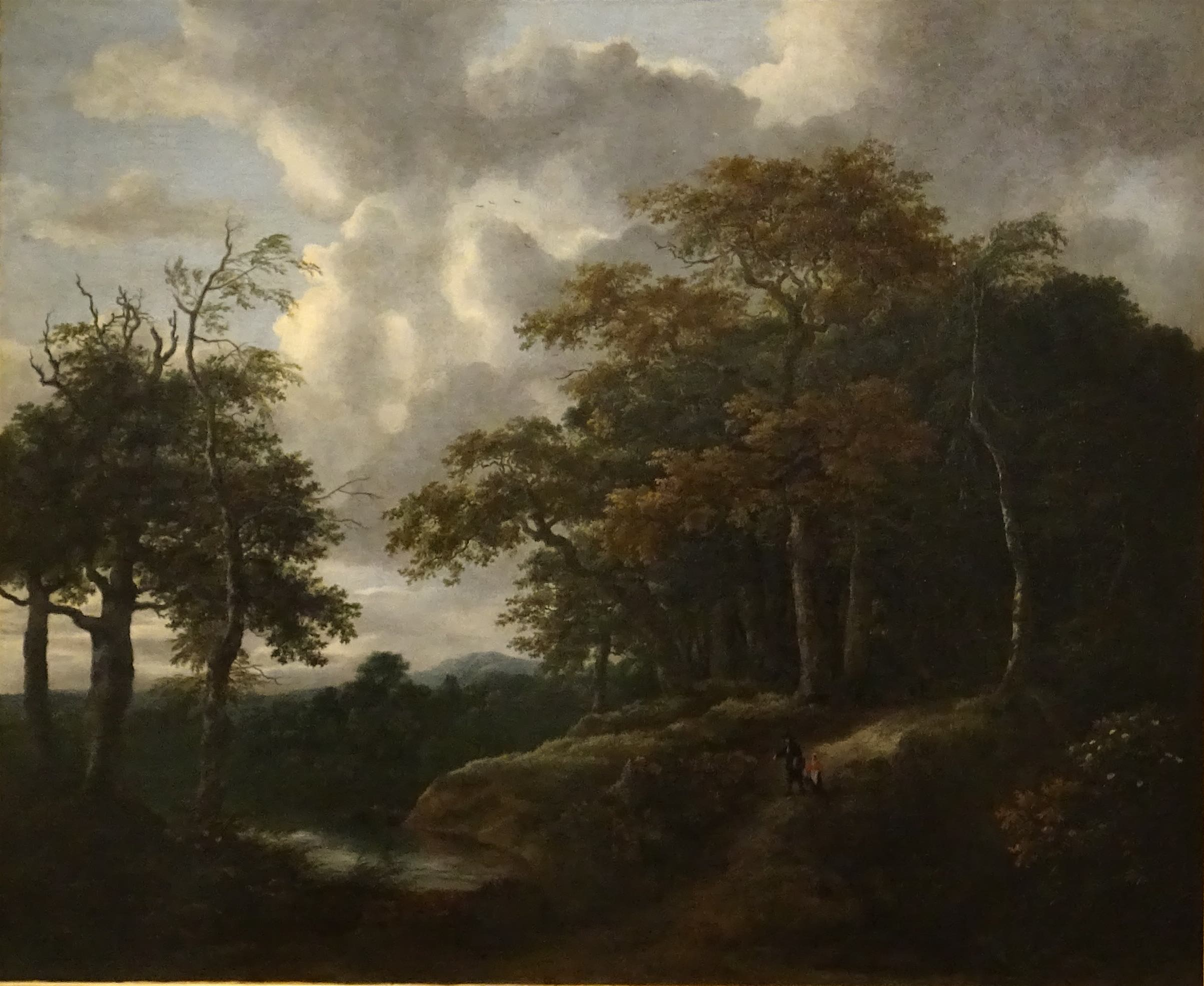
Entrance to a Forest (Jacob van Ruisdael)

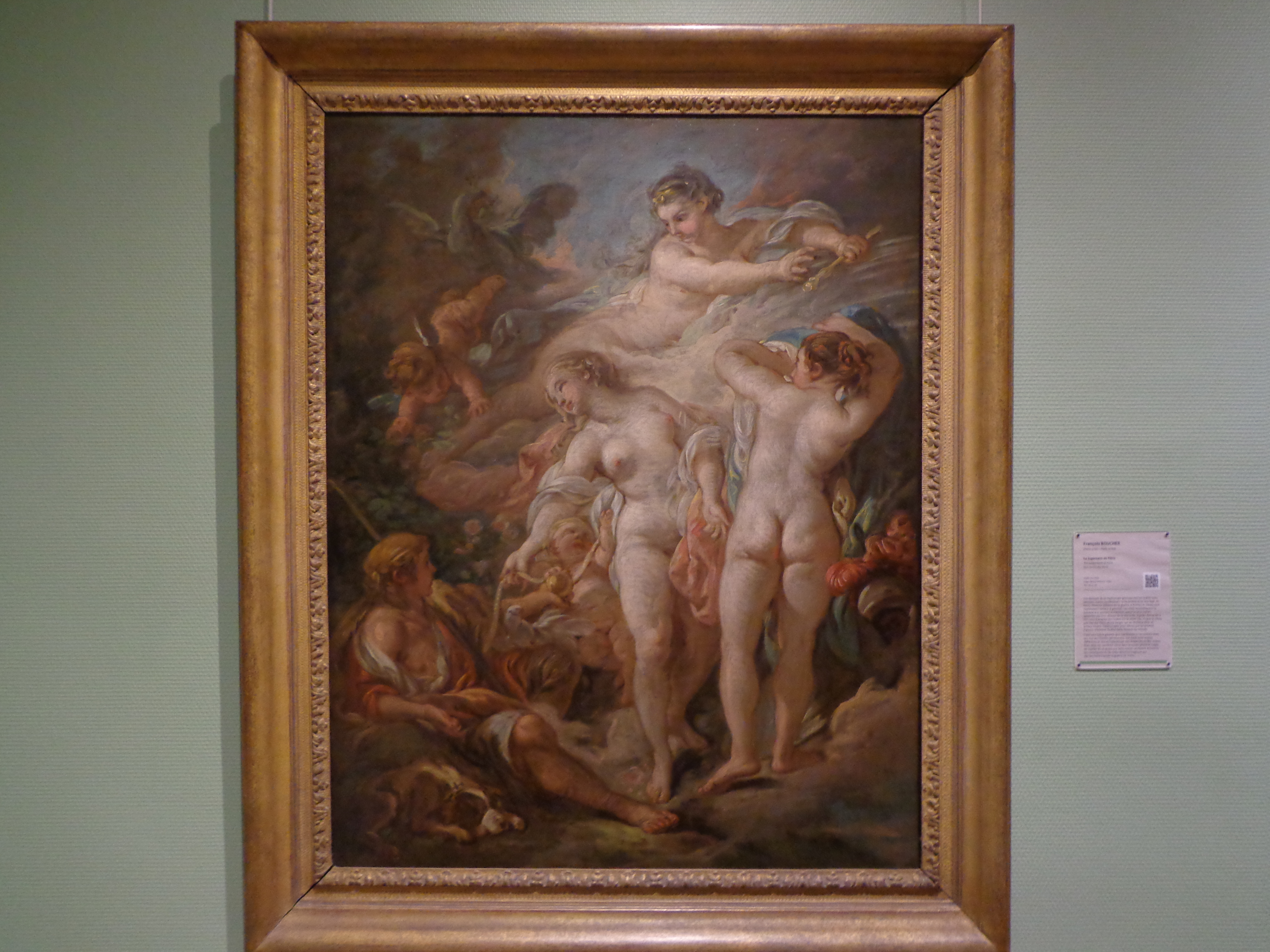
The Judgement of Paris (François Boucher)

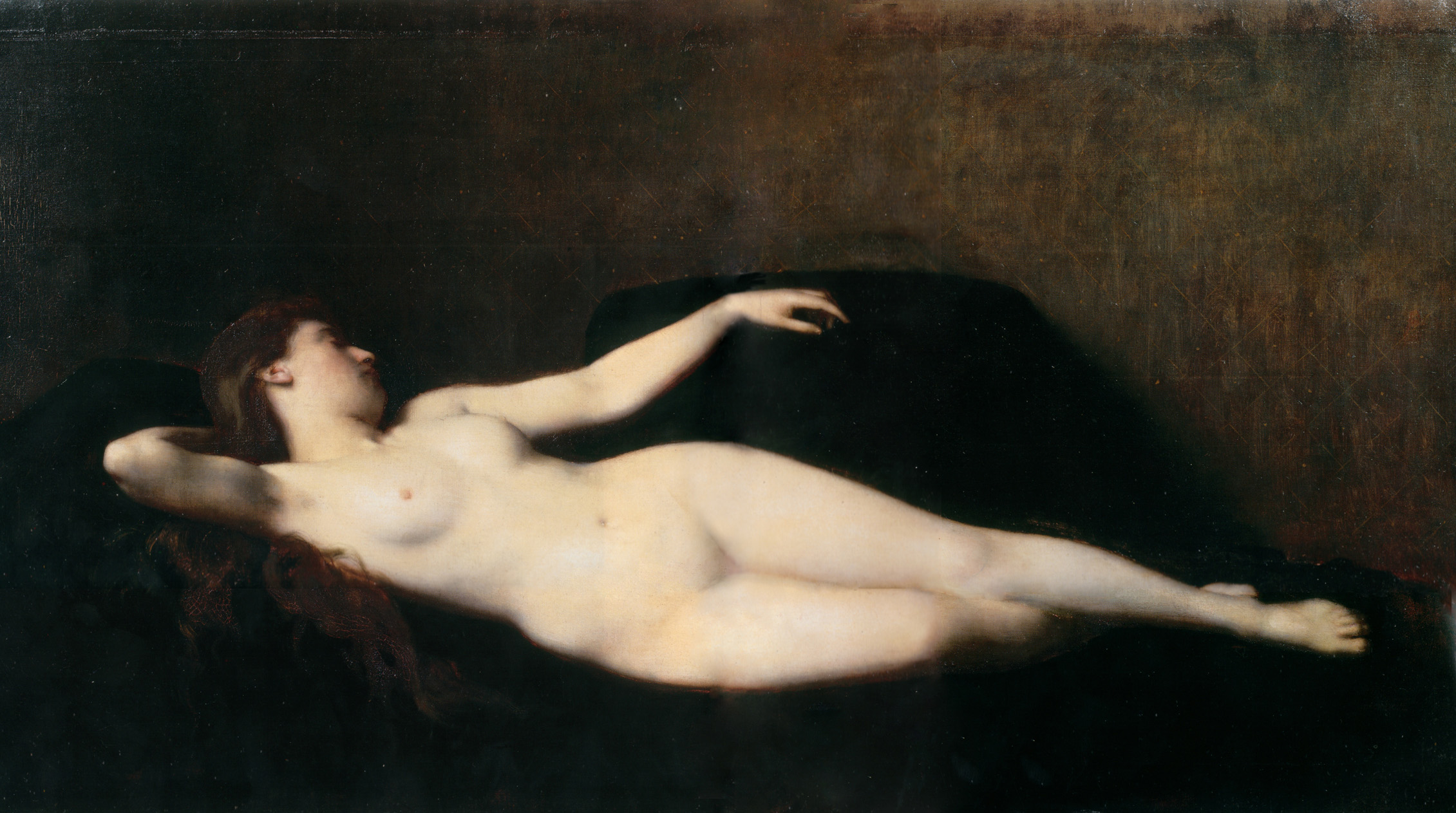
Woman on a Black Divan (Jean-Jacques Henner)

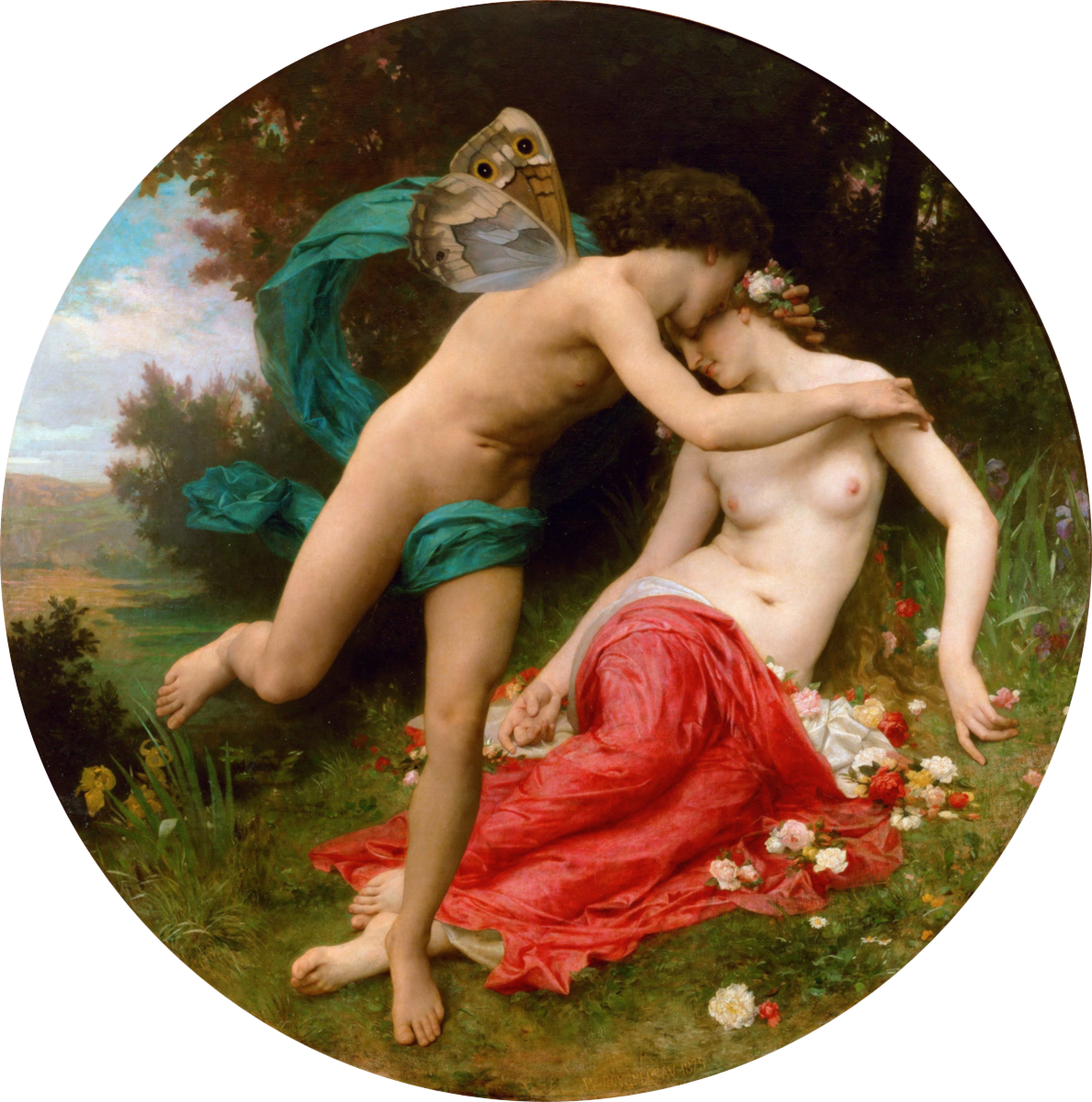
Flora and Zephyr (William Bouguereau)

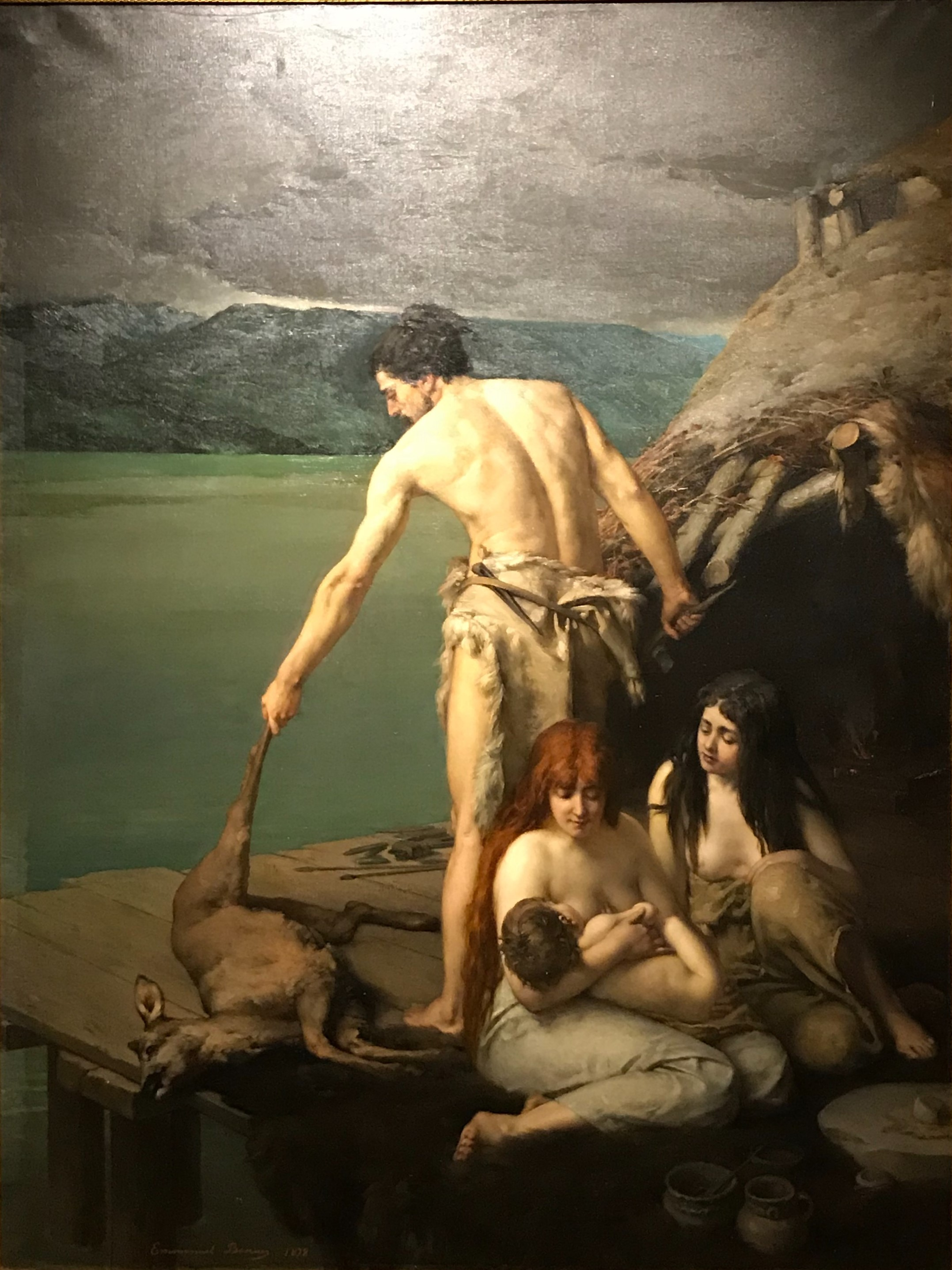
Lakeside Dwelling (Emmanuel Benner)

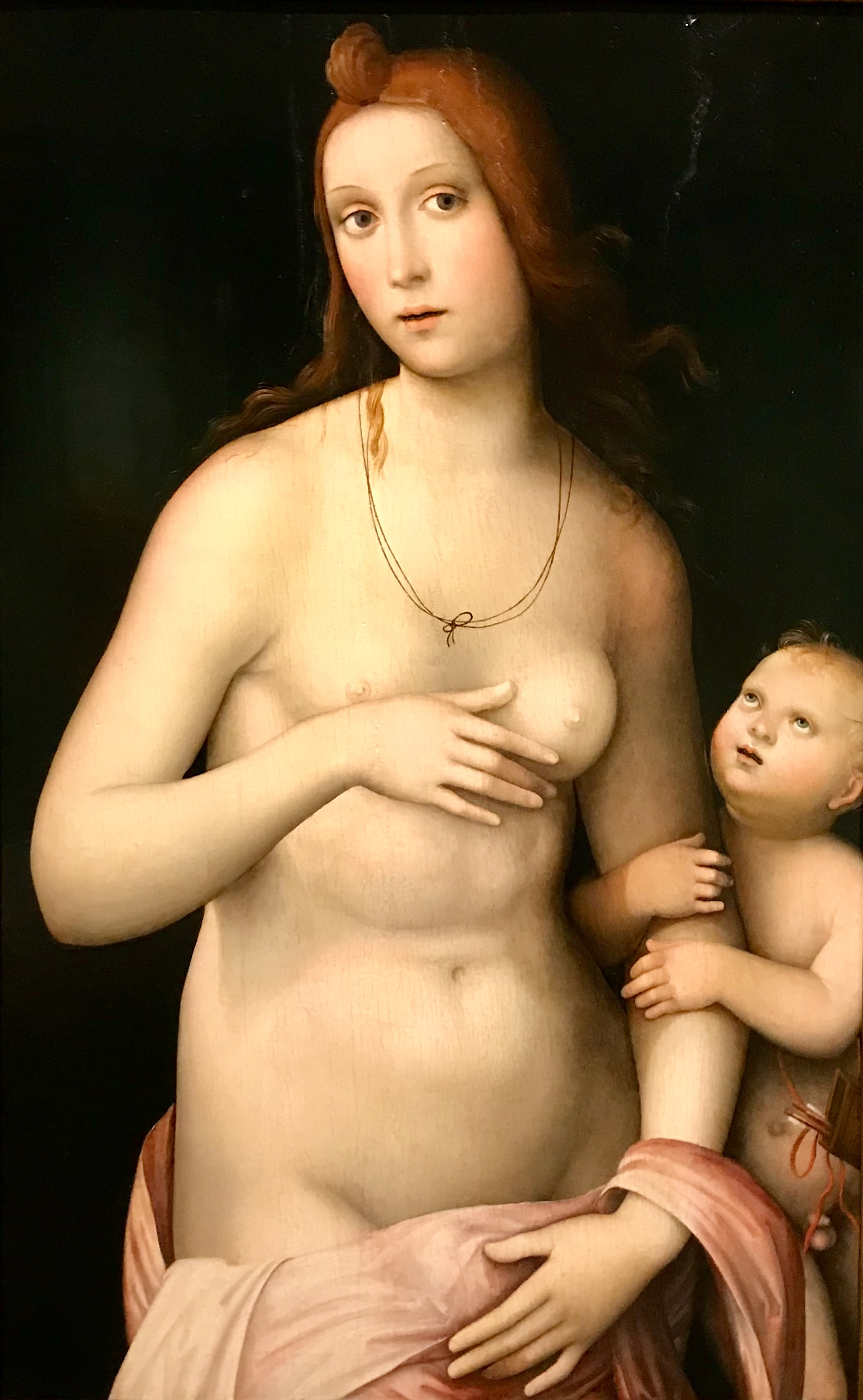
Venus and Cupid (Francesco Francia)

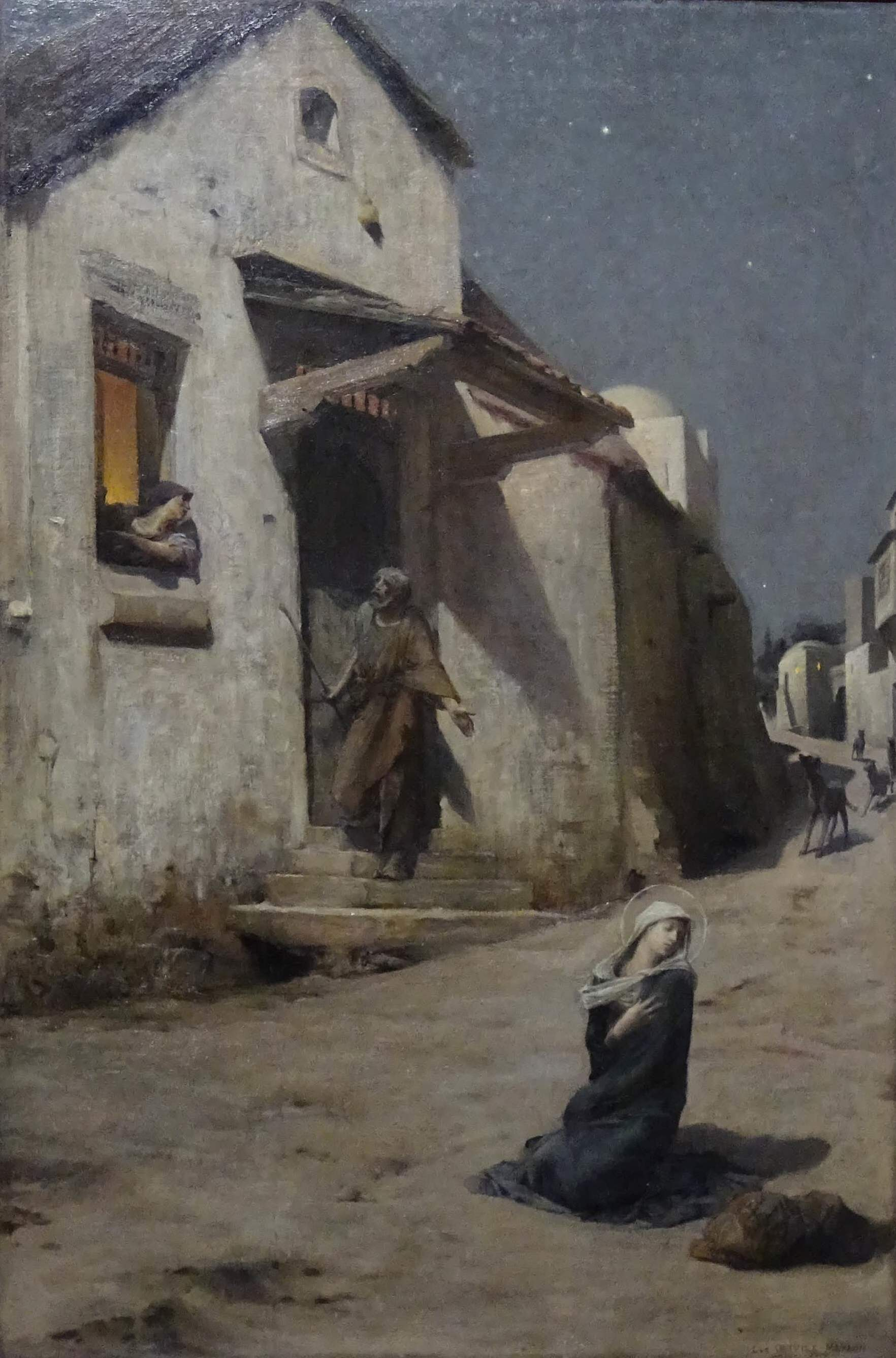
The Arrival at Bethlehem (Luc-Olivier Merson)

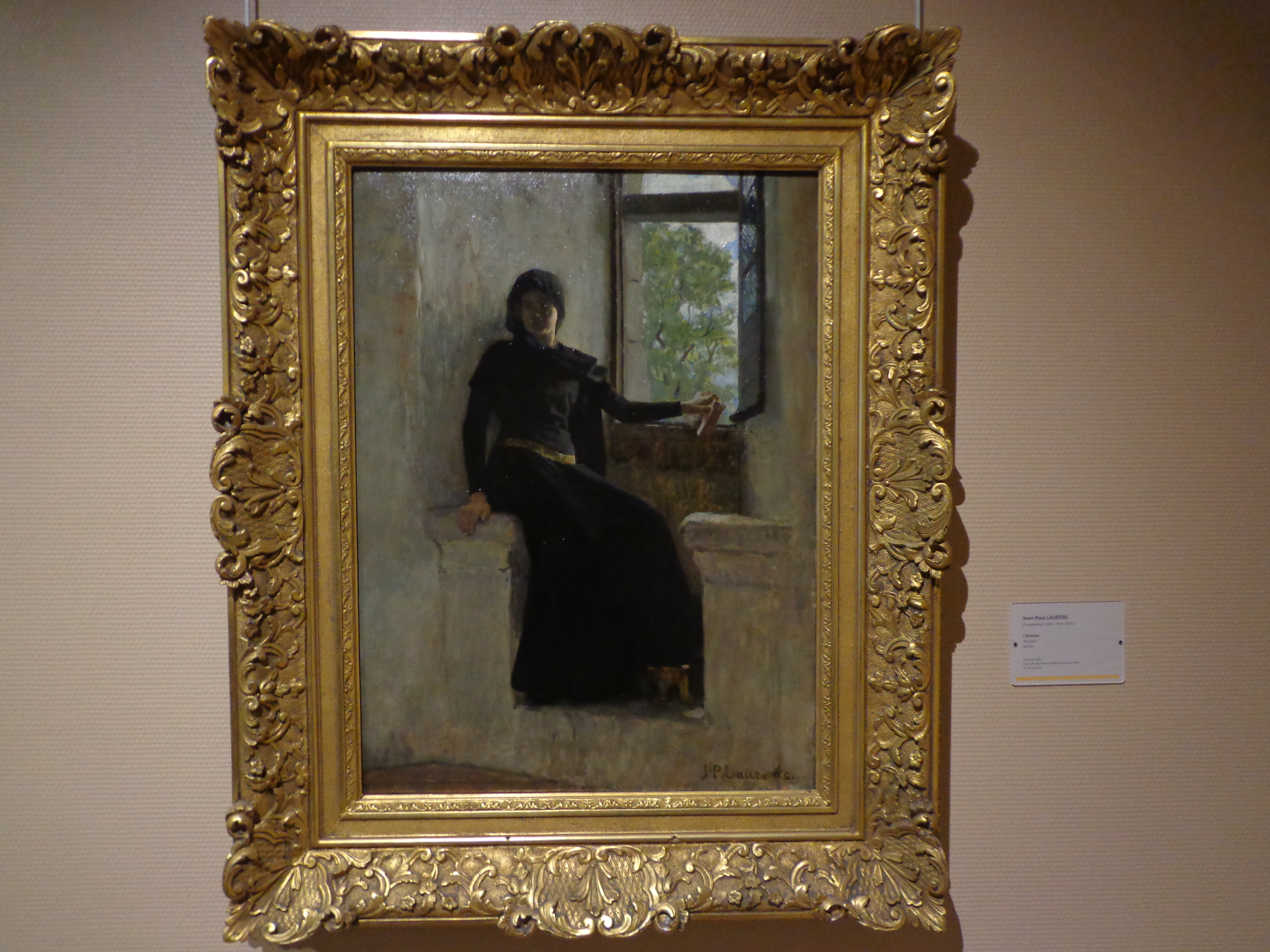
Waiting (Jean-Paul Laurens)

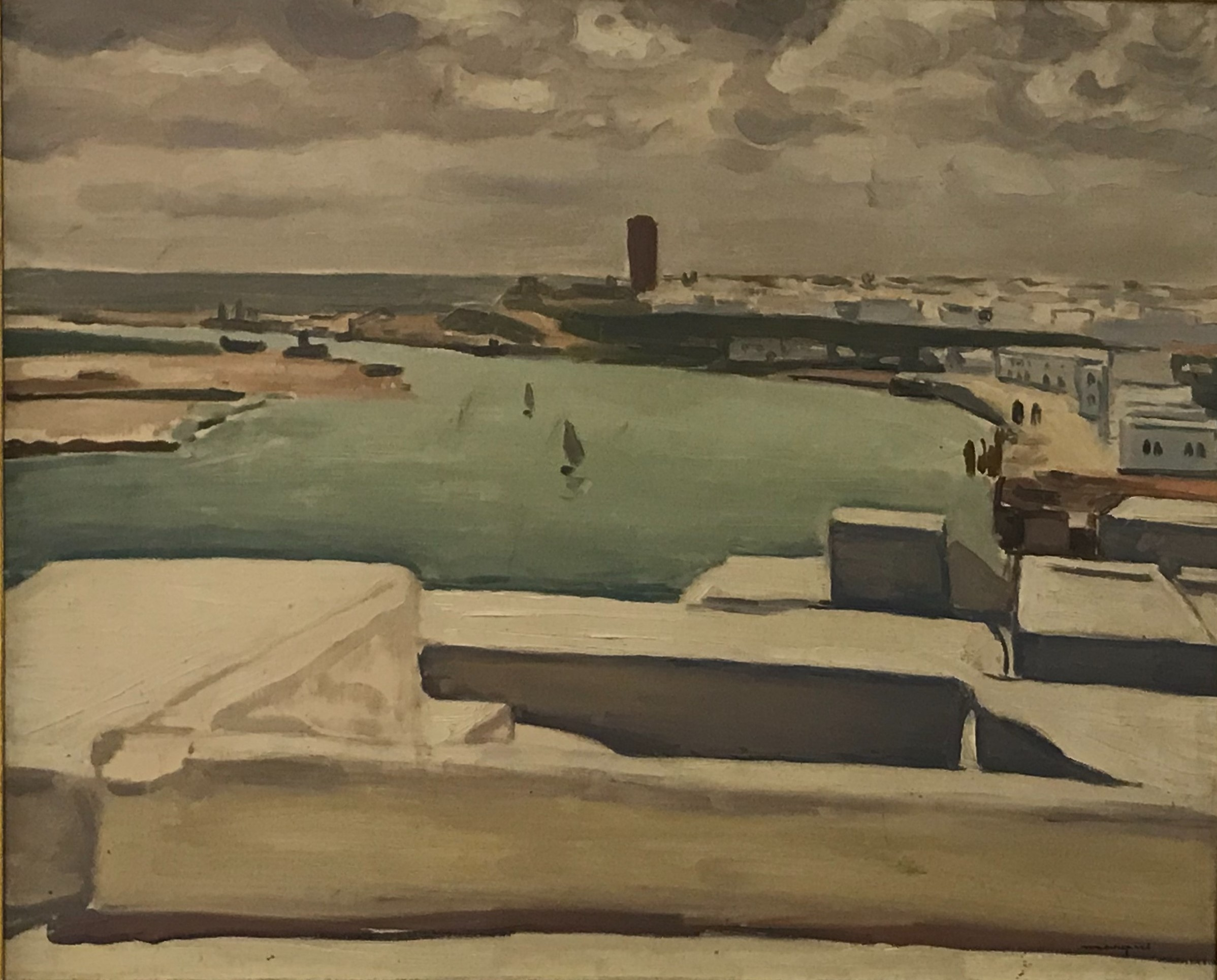
The Harbour of Rabat (Albert Marquet)

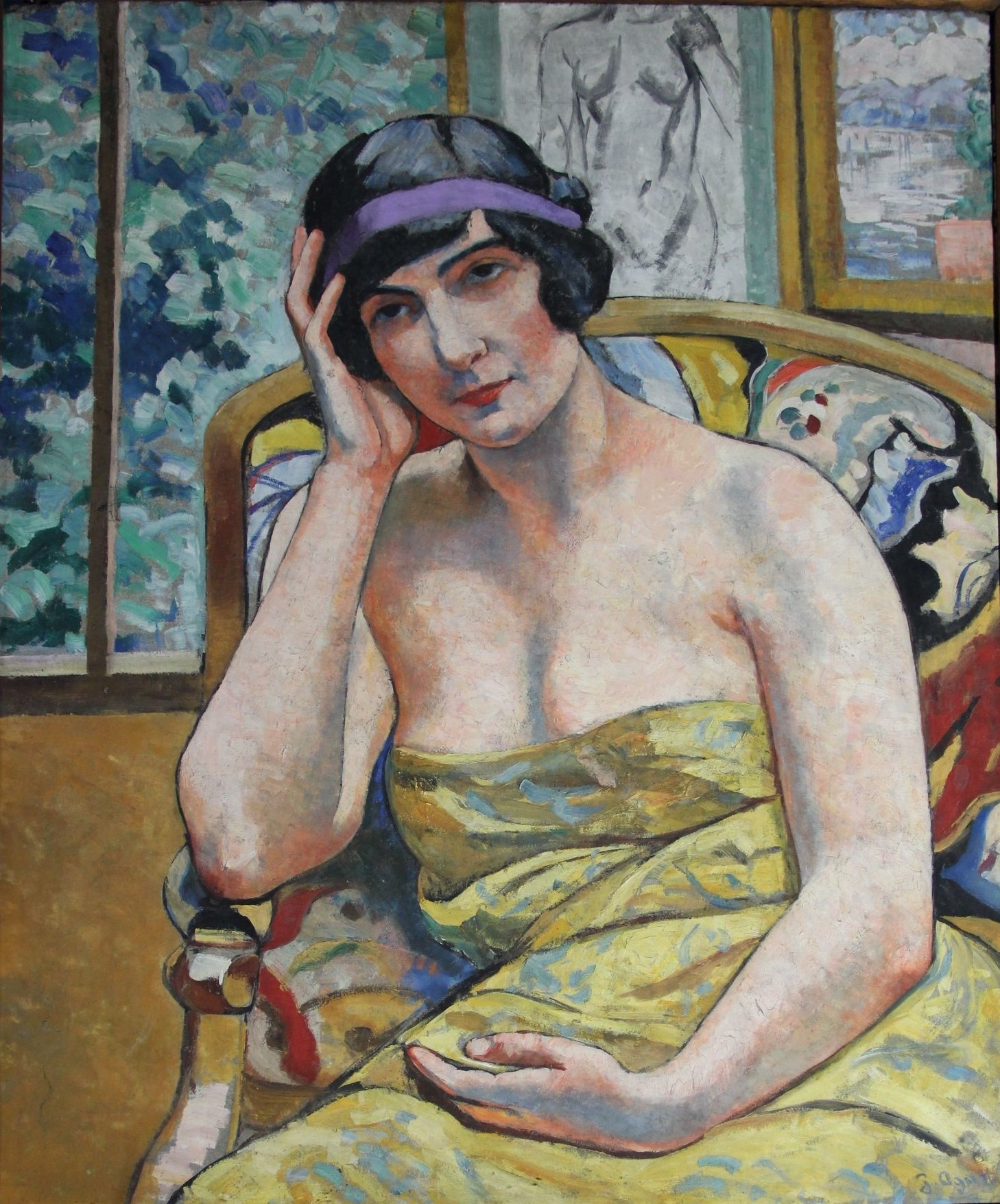
The Beautiful Italian Woman (Georgette Agutte)

== Bibliography ==
- Isabelle Dubois-Brinkmann: Musée des Beaux-Arts de Mulhouse. Œuvres choisies. I.D. l'Édition, November 2019. ISBN 978-2-36701-186-8.
