= François-Édouard Picot =

French painter (1786–1868)

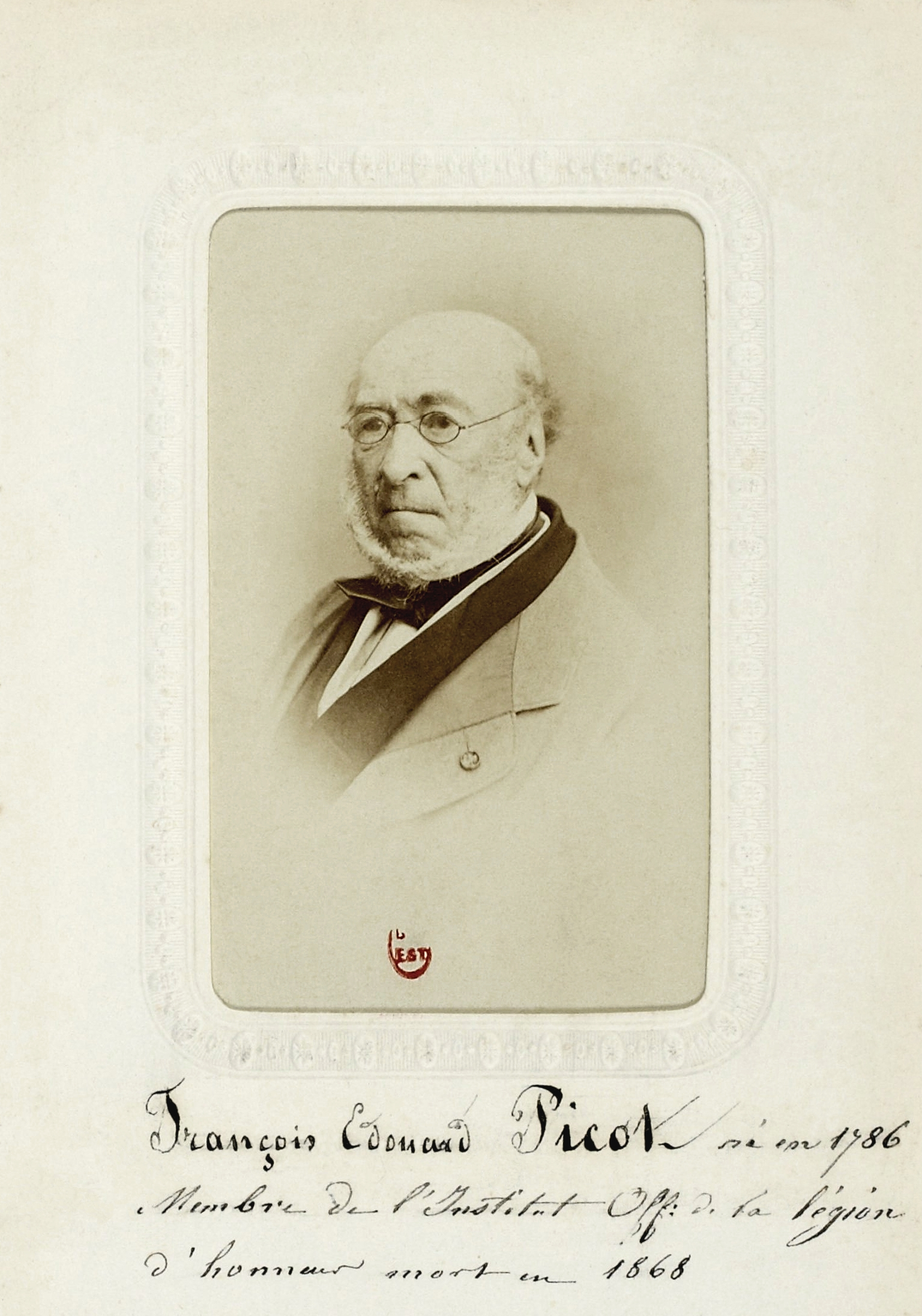
François-Edouard Picot, c. 1865

François-Édouard Picot (French: [fʁɑ̃swa edwaʁ piko]; 10 October 1786 – 15 March 1868) was a French painter during the July Monarchy, painting mythological, religious and historical subjects.

== Life ==
Born in Paris, Picot studied with François-André Vincent and Jacques-Louis David. He won the Prix de Rome painting scholarship in 1813, and gained success at the 1819 Salon with his neoclassical L'Amour et Psyché (Louvre).

Picot painted The Crowning of the Virgin in the church of Notre-Dame-de-Lorette and had large commissions for the Galerie des Batailles. He exhibited at the Paris Salon between 1819 and 1839. Elected to the Paris Academy in 1836, Picot was also created an officer of the Legion of Honor in 1832. He died in Paris in 1868.

== Works ==
- L'Amour et Psyché (Cupid and Psyche, 1817)
- Portrait of Adélaïde-Sophie Cléret (c.1817)
- Portrait of Nicholas-Pierre Tiolier (c. 1817)
- The Annunciation
- The Death of Sapphira (1819) Church of Saint Séverin.
- Two ceilings in the Louvre (Musée des Antiques)
- Couronnement de la Vierge (The Crowning of the Virgin (Notre-Dame de Loretto)
- L'Etude et le Génie dévoilent l'antique Egypte à la Grèce (Study and Genius reveals ancient Egypt and Greece, 1827)
- Cybèle protège contre le Vésuve les villes de Stabiae, Herculanum, Pompéi et Résina (Cybele protects from Vesuvius the towns of Stabiae, Herculanum, Pompeii and Resina, 1832)
- Léda (1832)
- The Siege of Calais, (1838)
- Peste de Florence (Grenoble Museum)

== Gallery ==
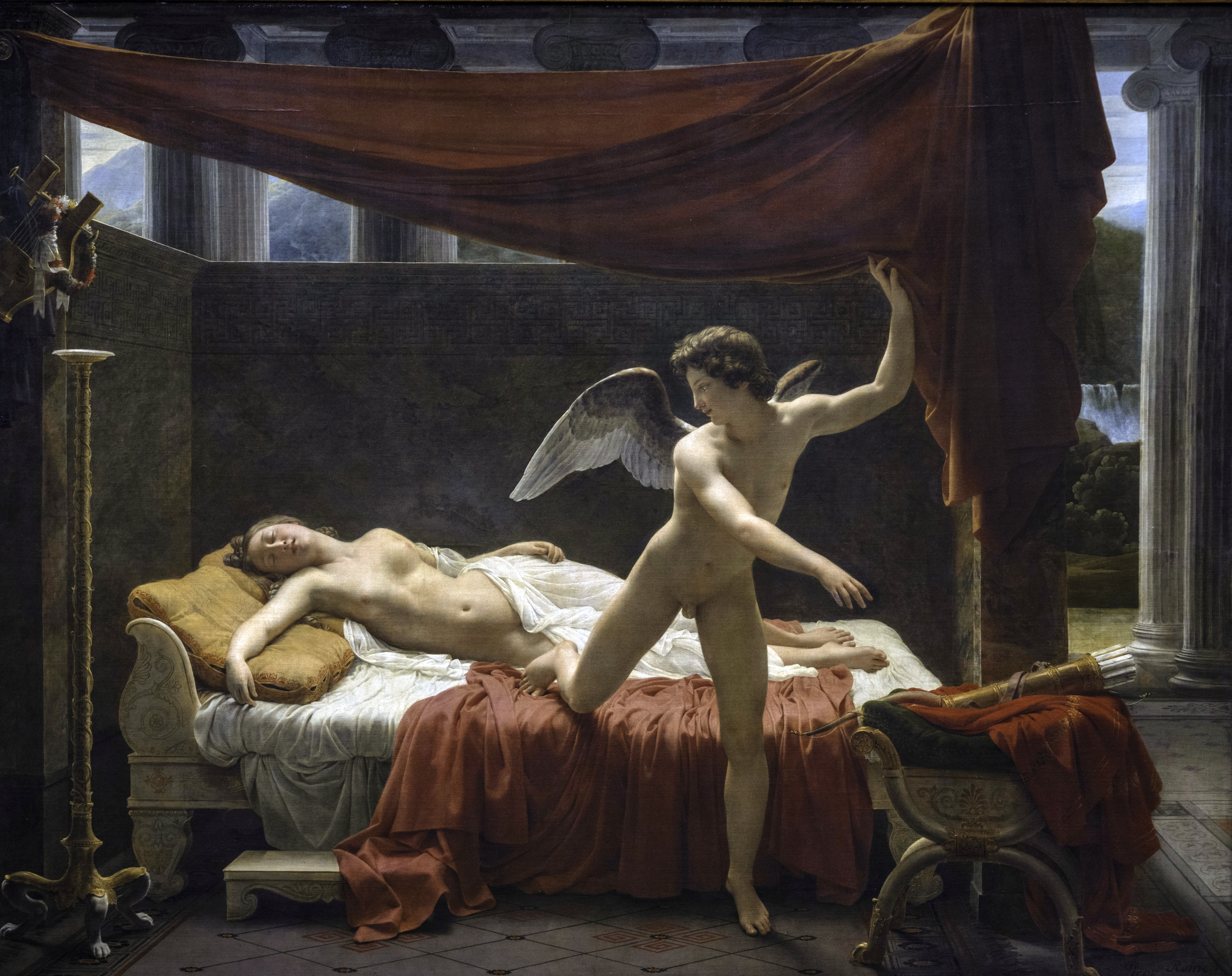
François-Édouard Picot, L'Amour et Psyché (1817).

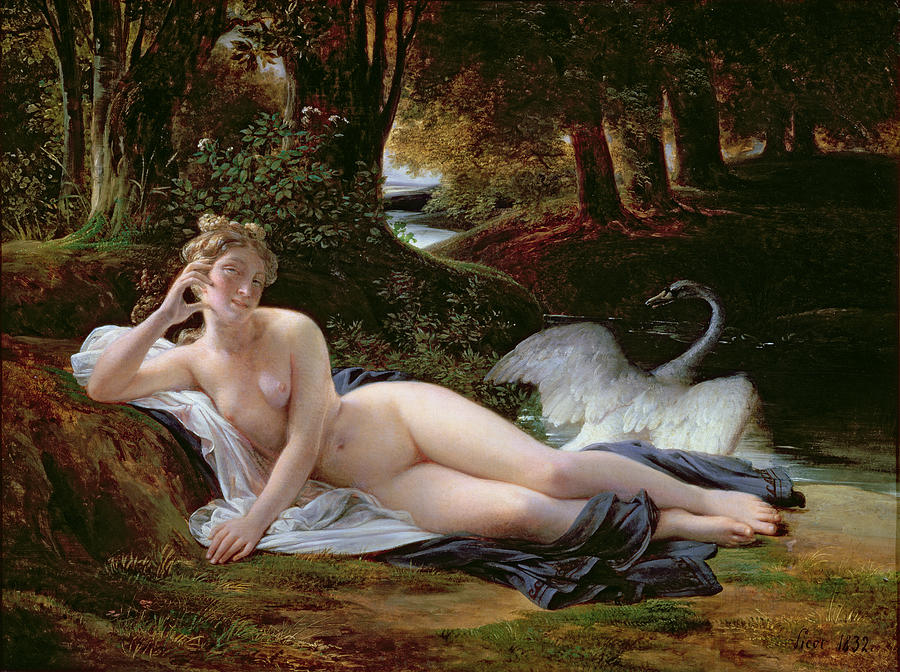
François-Édouard Picot, Léda (1832).

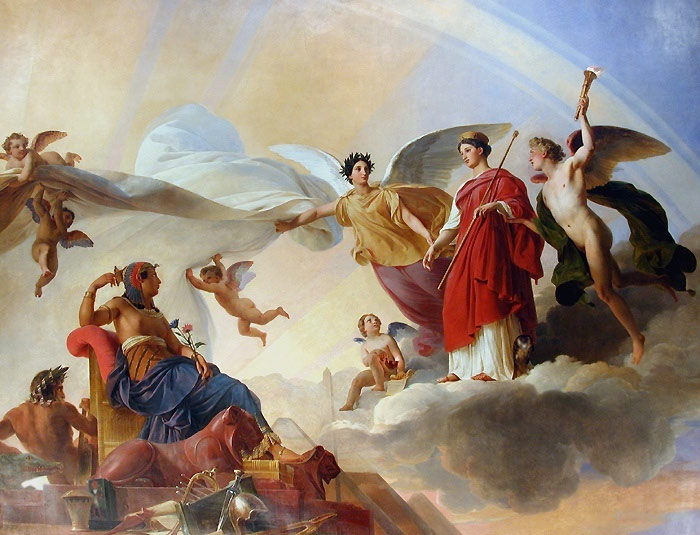
Study and Genius Unveil Ancient Egypt to Greece, 1827

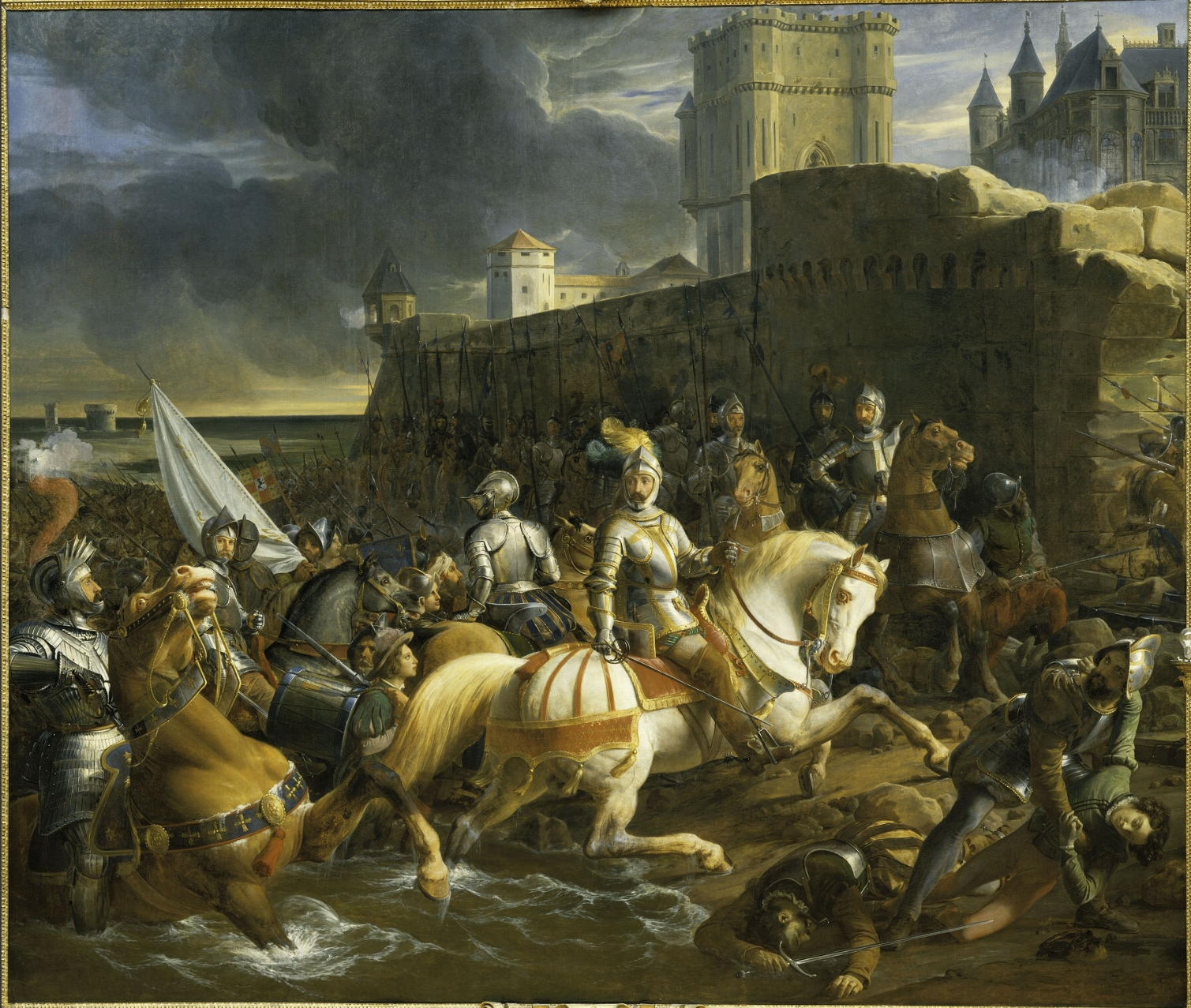
The Siege of Calais, 1838

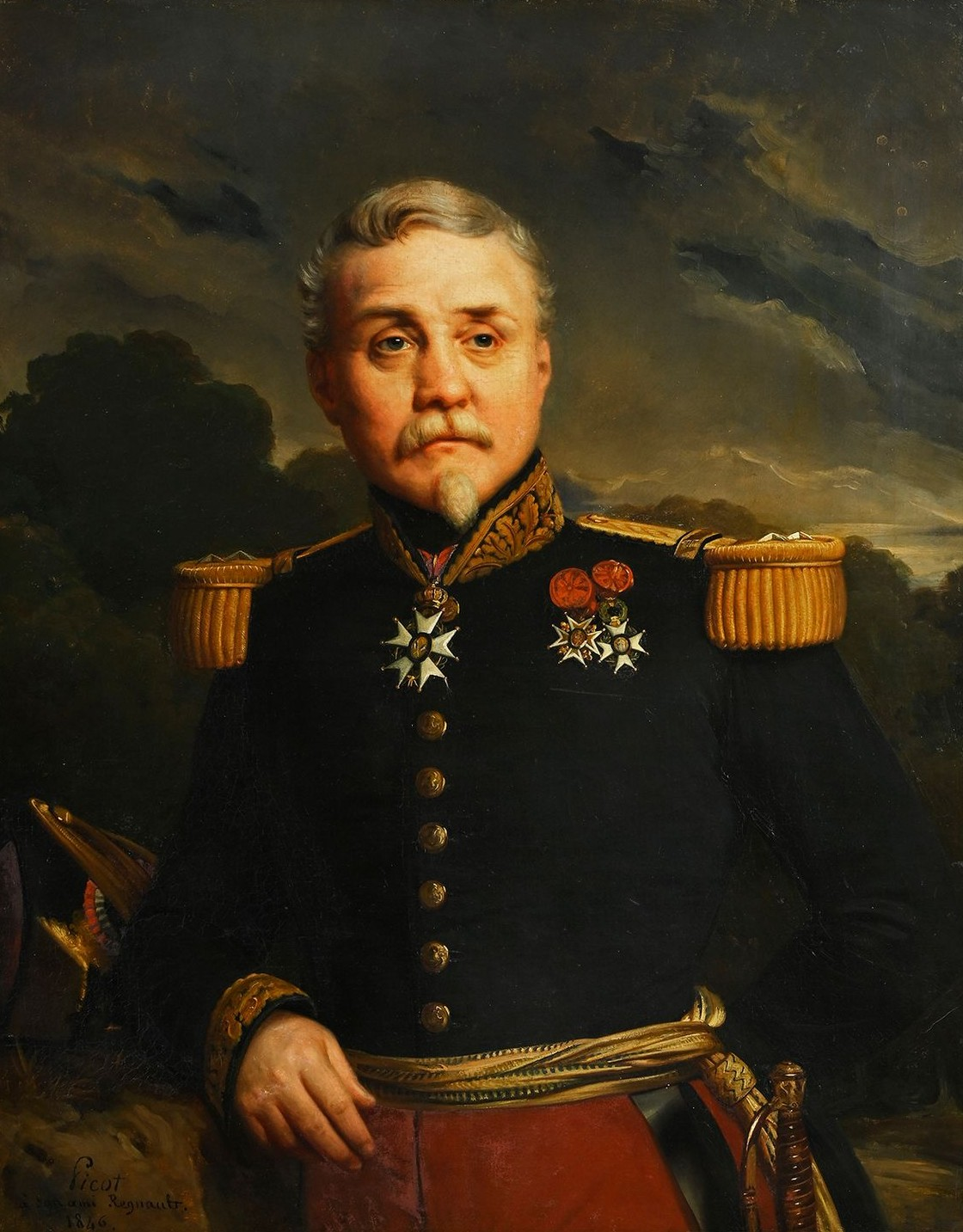
Antoine-Louis Regnault, 1846

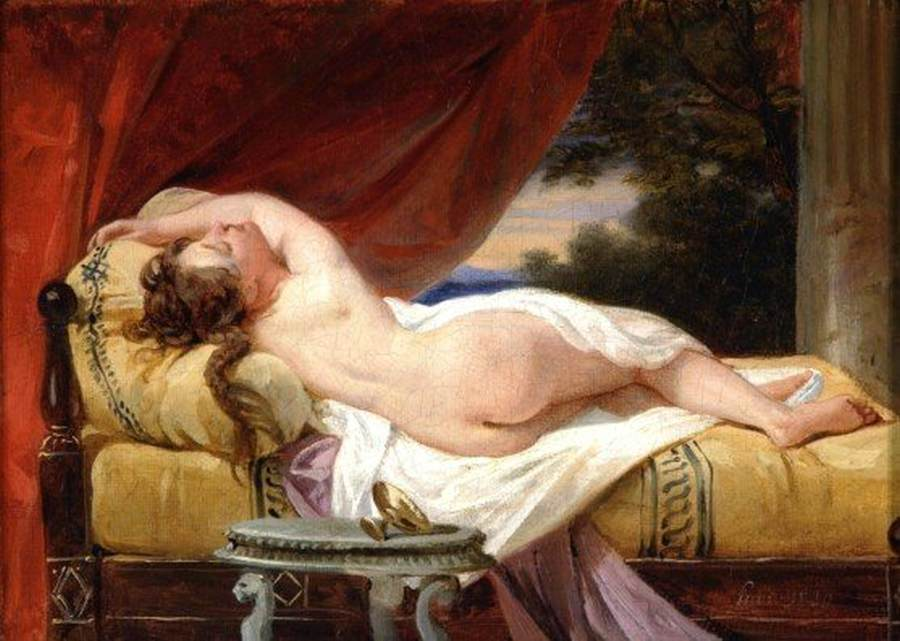
Odalisque, 1829

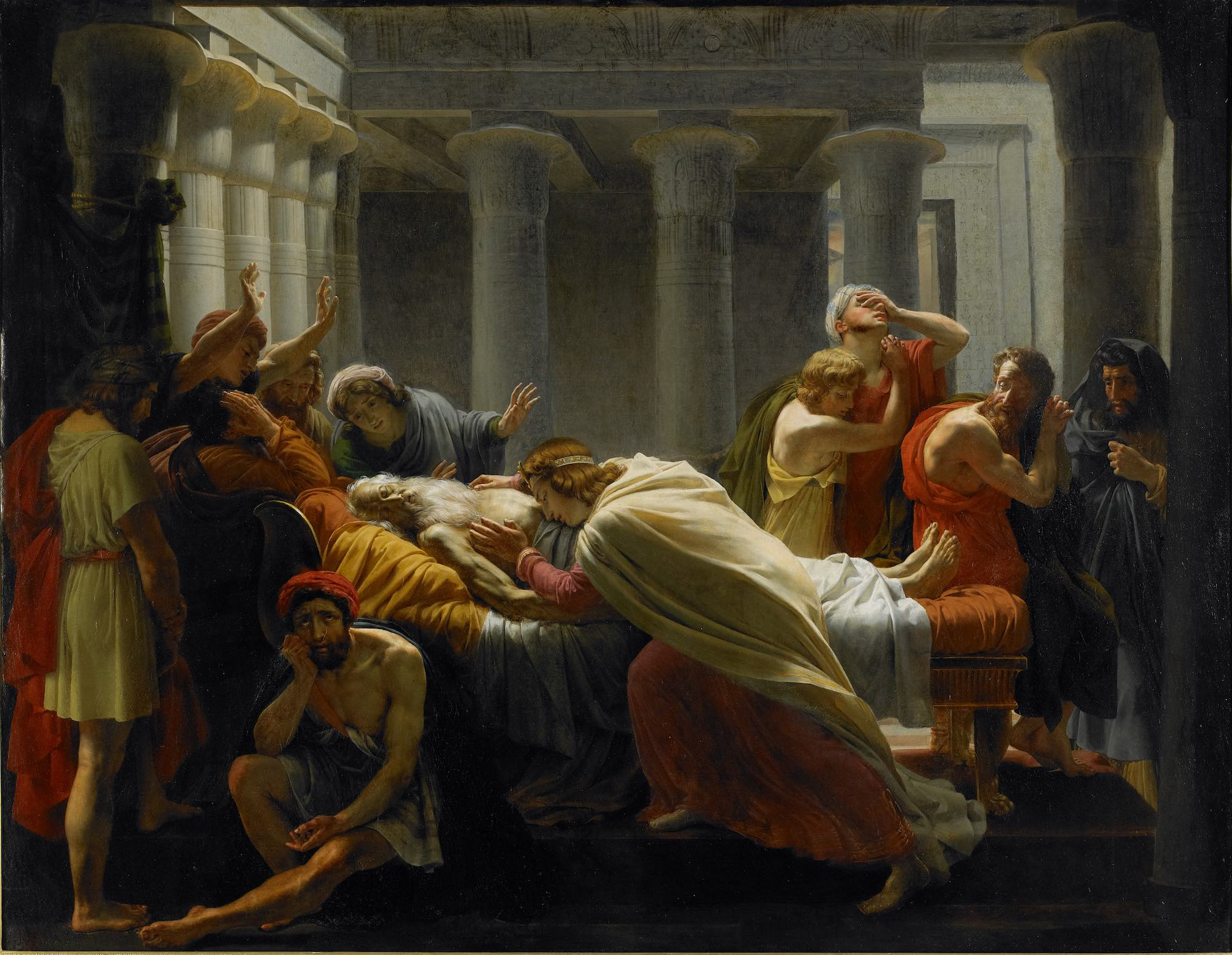
La mort de Jacob, 1813, Rennes, musée des Beaux-Arts

== Pupils ==
His pupils include:

- Étienne-Prosper Berne-Bellecour
- Édouard Théophile Blanchard
- Louis Émile Benassit
- Jean-Achille Benouville
- François-Léon Benouville
- William-Adolphe Bouguereau
- Alexandre Cabanel
- Charles-Alexandre Coëssin de la Fosse
- Jean-Jacques Henner
- Louis Héctor Leroux
- Émile Lévy
- Gustave Moreau
- Léon Bazile Perrault
- Jules-Émile Saintin
- Jehan Georges Vibert
