= Charles-Alexandre Coëssin de la Fosse =

French painter

- Born: 1829; Lisieux, France
- Died: 1910 (aged 80–81); Paris, France
- Education: François-Édouard Picot, Thomas Couture
- Known for: painting, drawing, engraving
- Notable work: L'embuscade; La mort de Dom Juan; La joueuse de tambourin
- Movement: Neoclassicism, History painting
- Awards: Third class medal in 1873 (Paris)

Charles-Alexandre Coëssin de la Fosse (1829–1910) was a French neoclassicist painter and engraver.

== Life ==
He was born in Lisieux, Calvados (a department in Normandy), he went to Paris in 1857 in a way to make his first exhibition. From this time and throughout his entire life, he exhibited regularly at the Salon. He painted mostly genre scenes—war, religion, and mythology—and is noted for his skill in composition and the use of color. He died in Paris in 1910.

His work is strongly influenced by the reaction against the Republic, and by the Catholic religion. This is obviously an expression of his personal conviction: actually his family was a noble and traditional one, but the influence of his patrons was probably determinative. Much of Coëssin de la Fosse's work represents the chouans, like L'embuscade (the ambush), or Catholic worship scenes such as Procession autour d'une croix en pierre (Procession around a stone cross).

Today, his work is owned by museums in Bayeux, Gray, Liège, Lisieux, Reims, Paris, and New York.

== Work ==
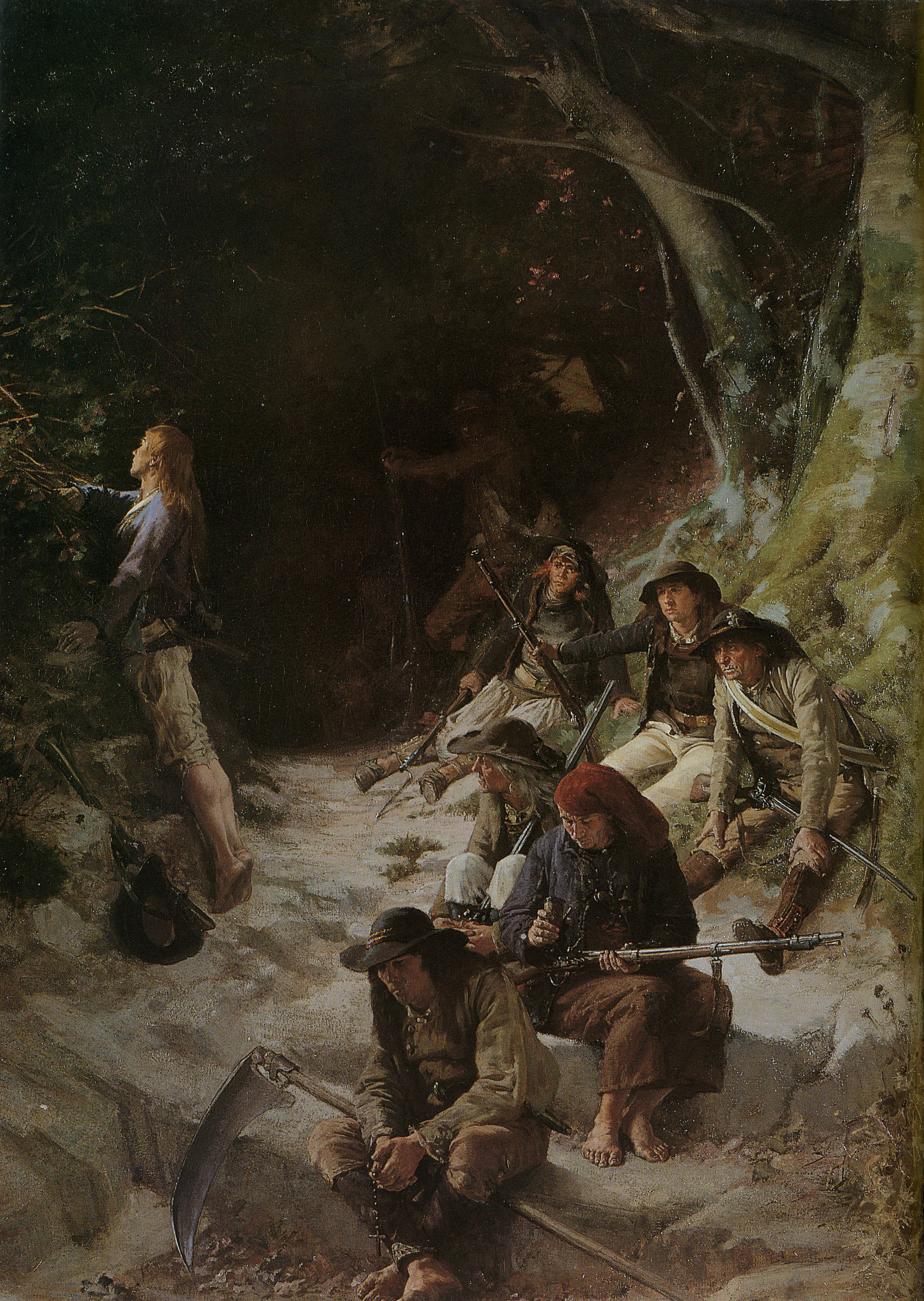
L'embuscade, épisode de la Chouannerie, 1883.

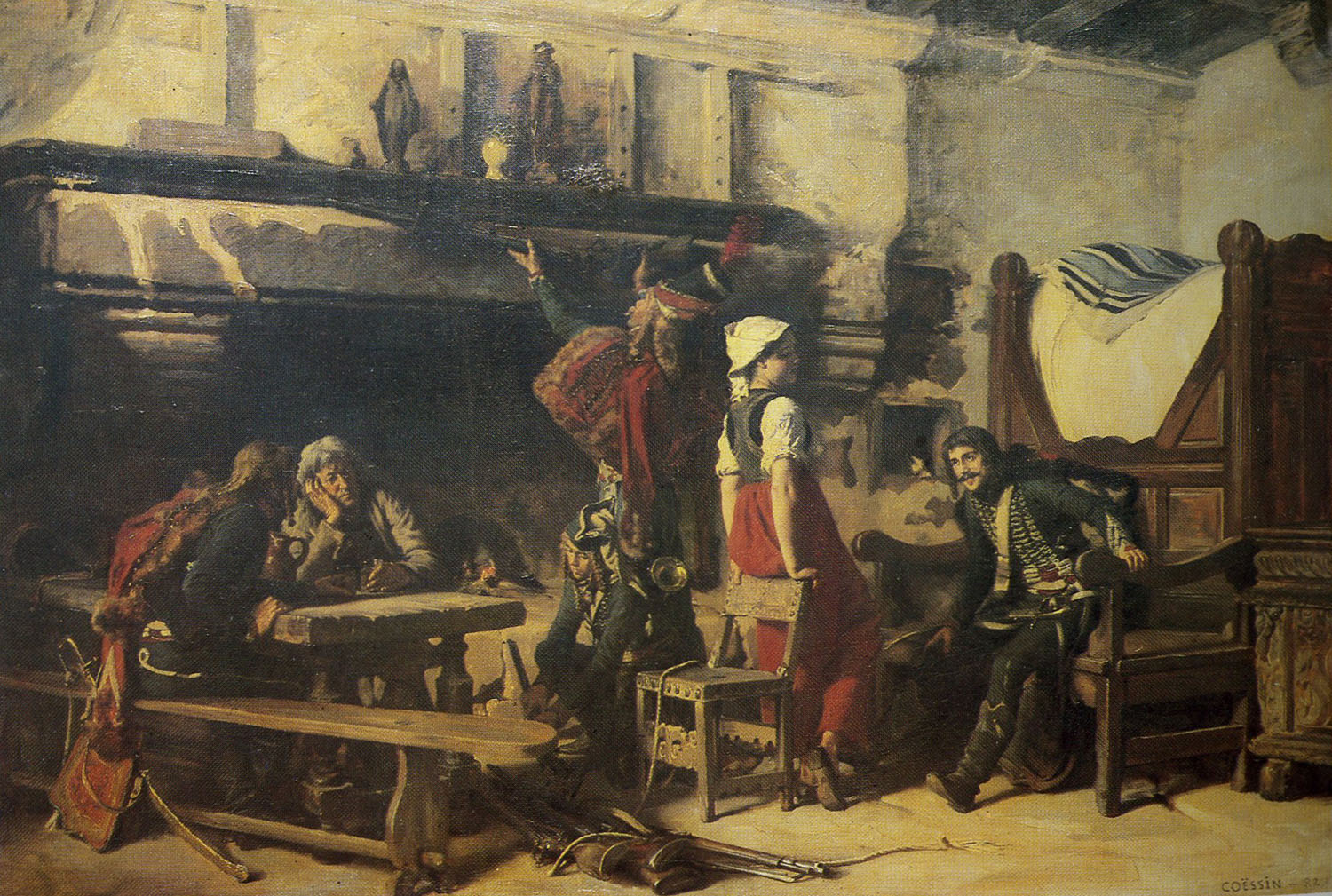
Scène de pacification de la Vendée en 1795 – 9e hussard, 1882.
- L'embuscade (oil on canvas)
- Bénédiction des combattants vendéens (oil on canvas)
- La joueuse de tambourin (oil on canvas, 1873)
- Les politiques au Palais Royal (oil on canvas, 1873)
- Après le banquet (oil on canvas, 1876)
- La mort de Dom Juan (oil on canvas, 1878)
- Une procession au Pardon de Ploumanac'h (oil on canvas, 1884)
- Le sauvetage : chasse au lion en Arabie (drawing, 1886)
- La fête de la raison (oil on canvas, 1889)
- Pousse au large (oil on canvas, 1889)
- Diane (oil on canvas, 1889)

== See also ==
- Thomas Couture
- François-Édouard Picot
