= Jean-Achille Benouville =

French painter

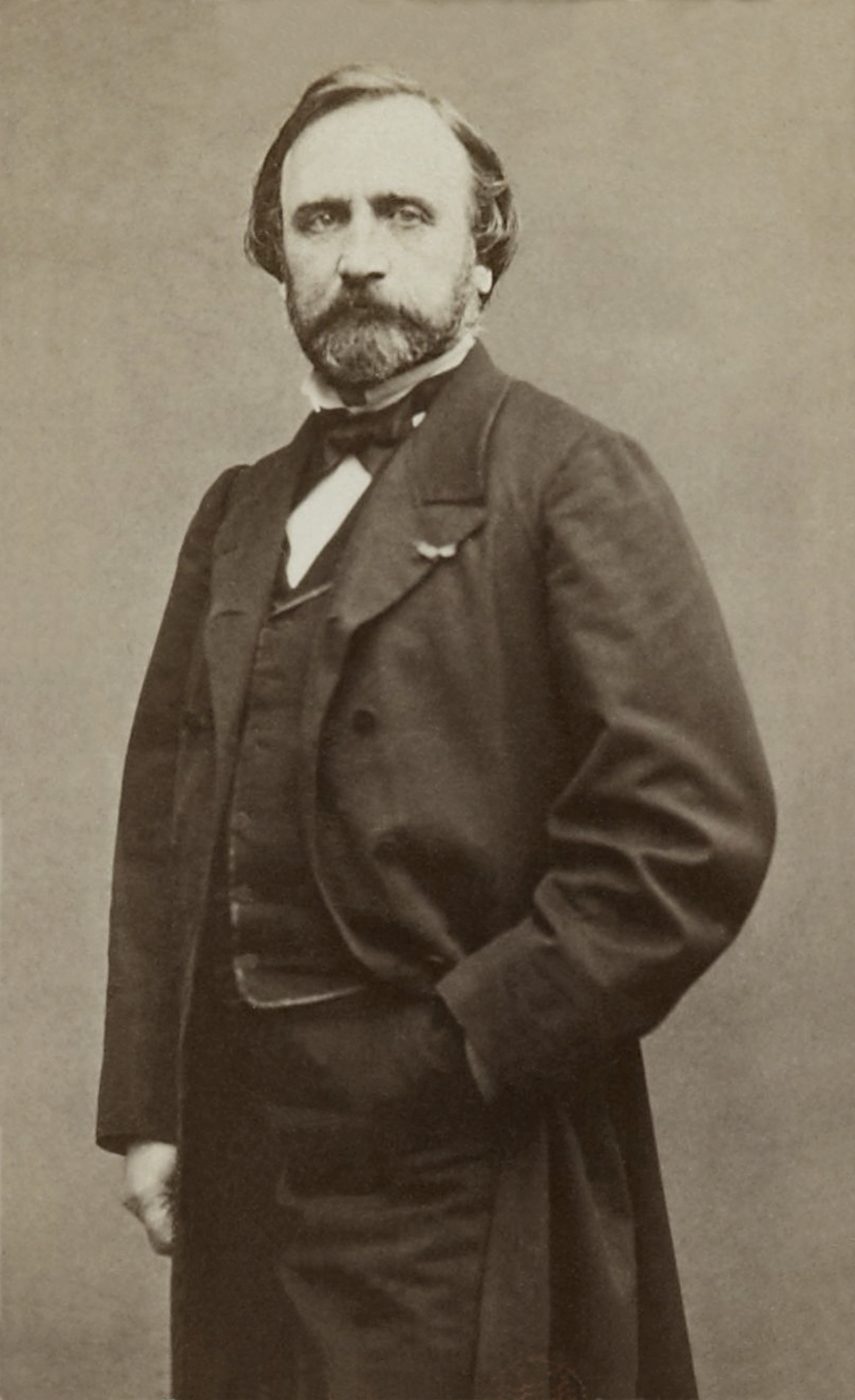
Jean-Achille Benouville; Photograph by Étienne Carjat (1864)

Jean-Achille Benouville (15 July 1815 – 8 February 1891) was a French landscape painter known for his views of Italy.

== Biography ==
He was born in Paris. Together with his younger brother, François-Léon, he was apprenticed to François-Édouard Picot and, later, to Léon Cogniet. He painted numerous landscapes in the vicinity of Paris, Italia Compiègne and Fontainebleau.

In 1834, he had his first exhibition at the Salon. Three years later, he was admitted to the École nationale supérieure des beaux-arts. In 1845, he was awarded the Prix de Rome for historic landscape painting for his work Ulysses and Nausicaa. As a result, he was able to make three trips to Italy; one in the company of Jean-Baptiste Camille Corot, with whom he shared a studio in Rome.

After a stay of three years at the Villa Médicis, he decided to remain in Italy, although he continued to display his works at exhibitions in Paris. He was married in 1851 and had two sons: Pierre Louis and Léon, who both became architects. In 1863, he was named a Knight in the Legion of Honor.

He returned to France following his wife's death and remarried in 1871. He travelled frequently, to Italy, the Pyrenees and the Netherlands, until his death in Paris in 1891.

Maupassant dedicated his story, Mon oncle Jules (1883), to Benouville.

== Selected paintings ==
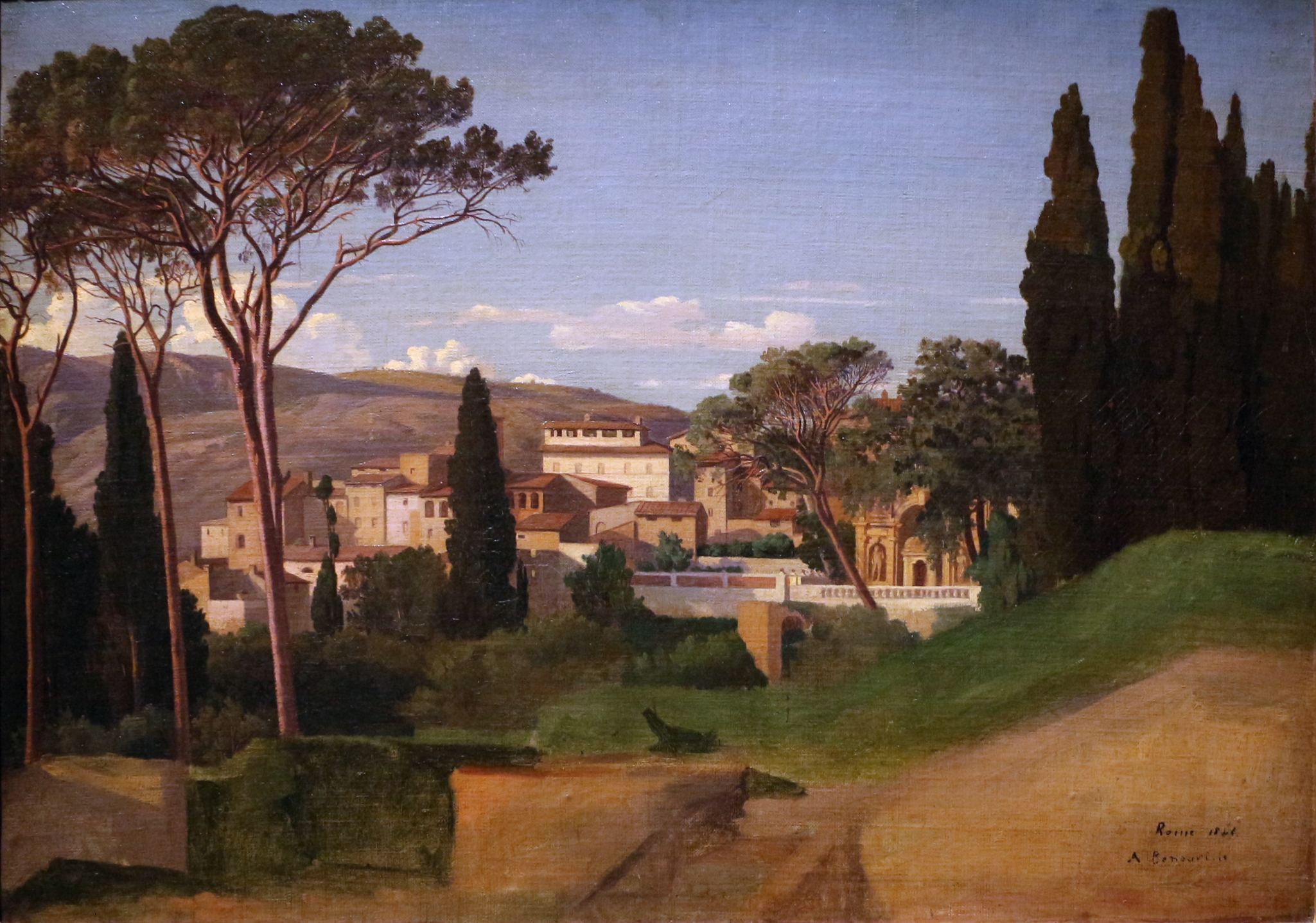
Roman Villa, 1844

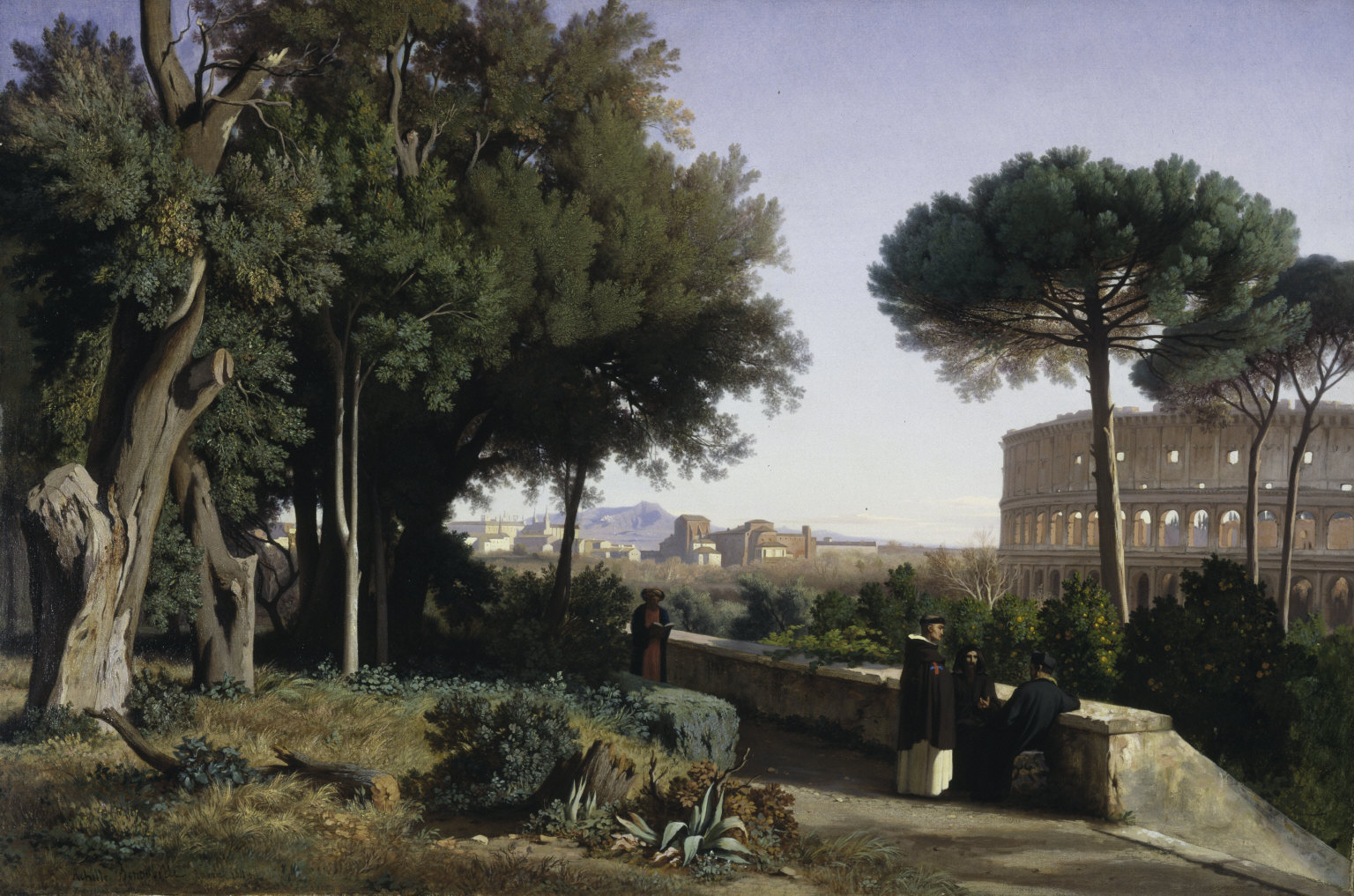
The Colosseum Viewed from the Palatine Hill, 1844

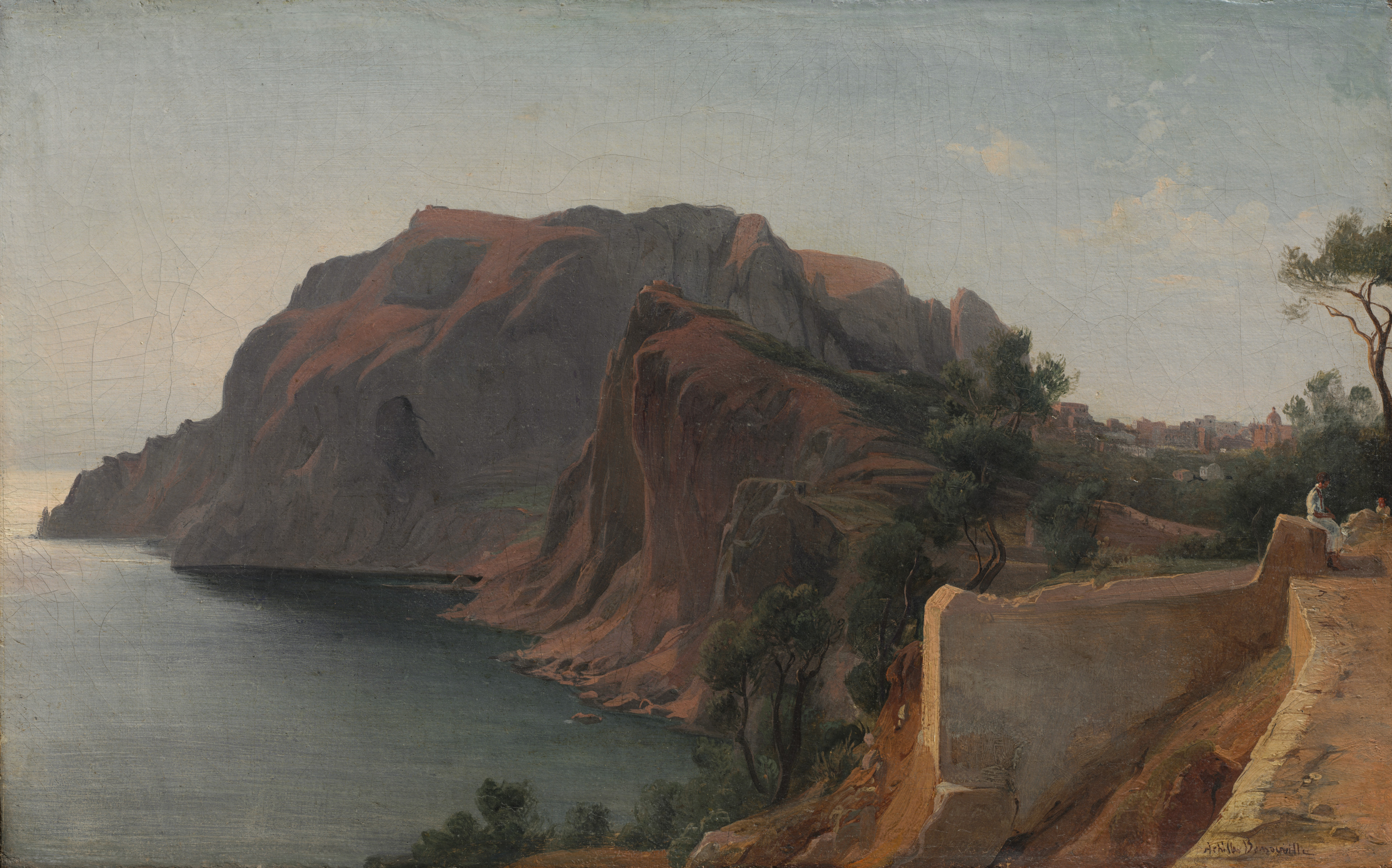
Capri, ca. 1845

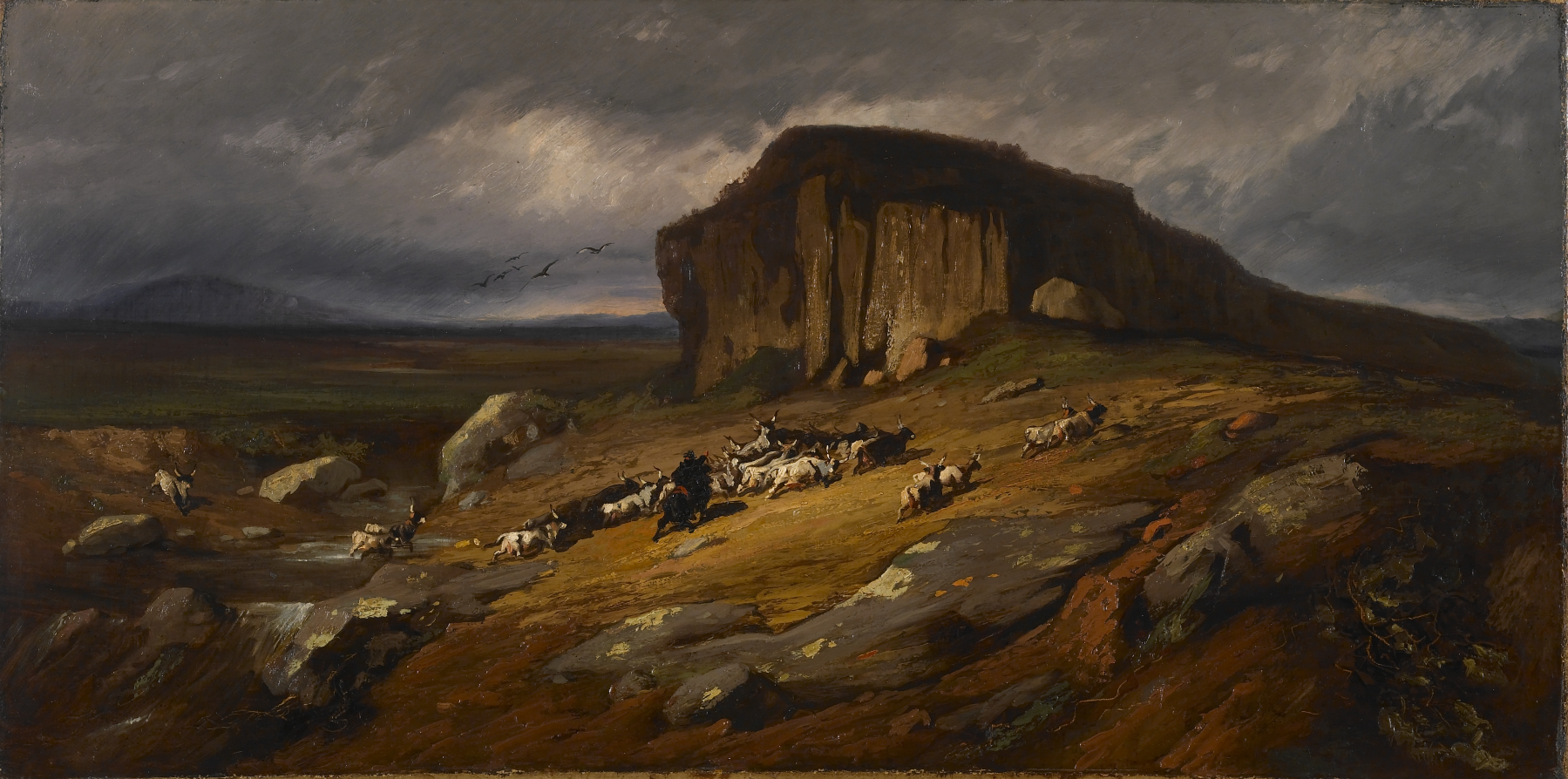
Landscape on the Roman Campagna,
with Buffaloes, ca. 1865–1868
