= François-Léon Benouville =

French painter

- Born: 30 March 1821; Paris
- Died: 16 February 1859 (aged 37); Paris
- Education: École des Beaux-Arts
- Movement: Neoclassical, Orientalist
- Awards: Prix de Rome (1845); Prix des Beaux Arts (1845) with Alexandre Cabanel

François-Léon Benouville (French pronunciation: [fʁɑ̃swa leɔ̃ bənuvil]; Paris 30 March 1821 – 16 February 1859 Paris) was a French painter noted for his Neoclassical religious compositions and for painting Orientalist subjects.

== Life and career ==
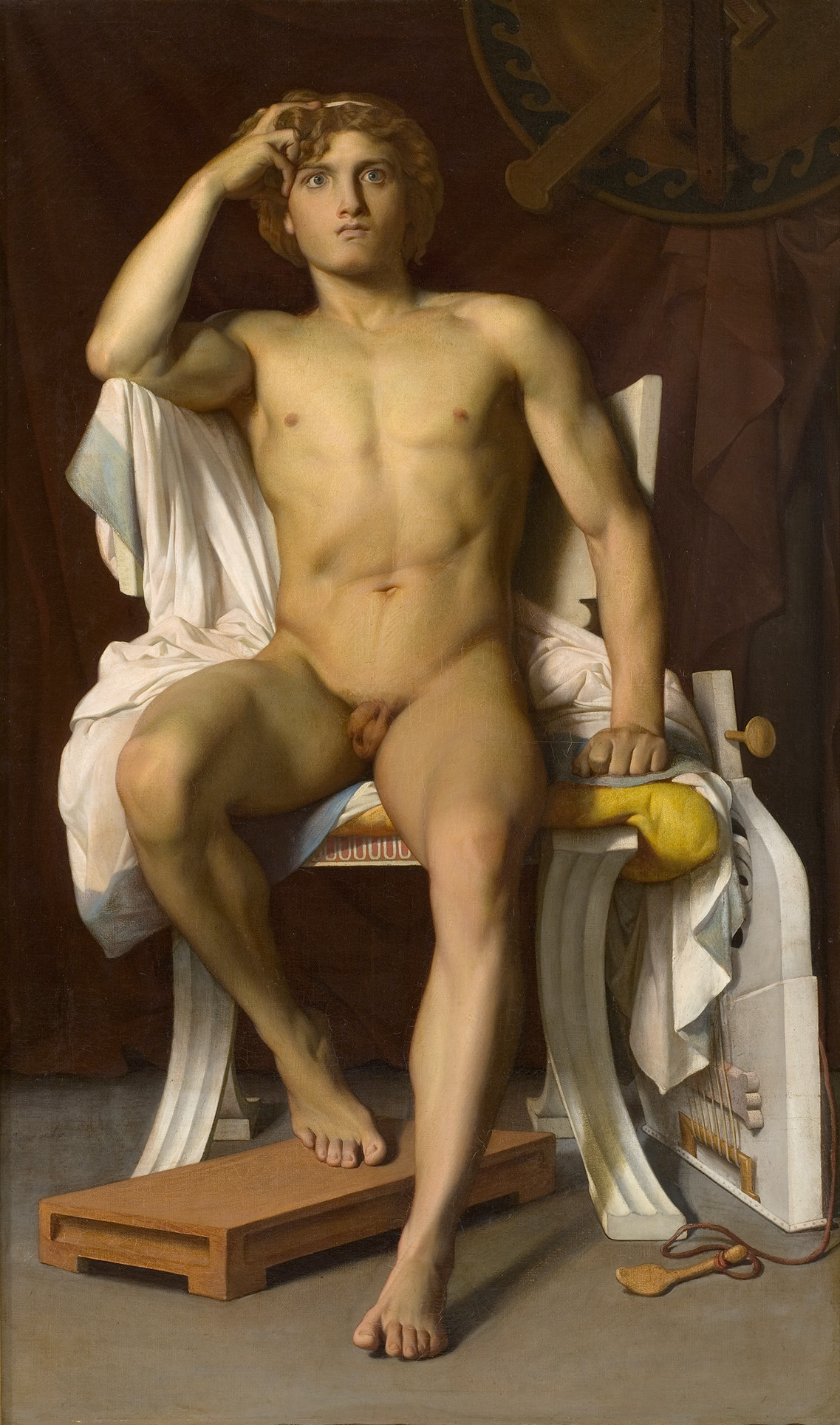
The Wrath of Achilles (1847), Musée Fabre, Montpellier

Léon Benouville first studied with his elder brother, Jean-Achille Benouville (1815–1891), in the studio of François-Edouard Picot before he transferred to École des Beaux-Arts in 1837. Like his brother he received the Prix de Rome in 1845. Both he and his brother travelled to Rome. In Rome, as a Prix de Rome pensionary at the Villa Medici. He remained there for a year, but his brother stayed on for two more years. His works produced in Rome are influenced by early Christianity and often show representations of antiquity.

== Work and style ==
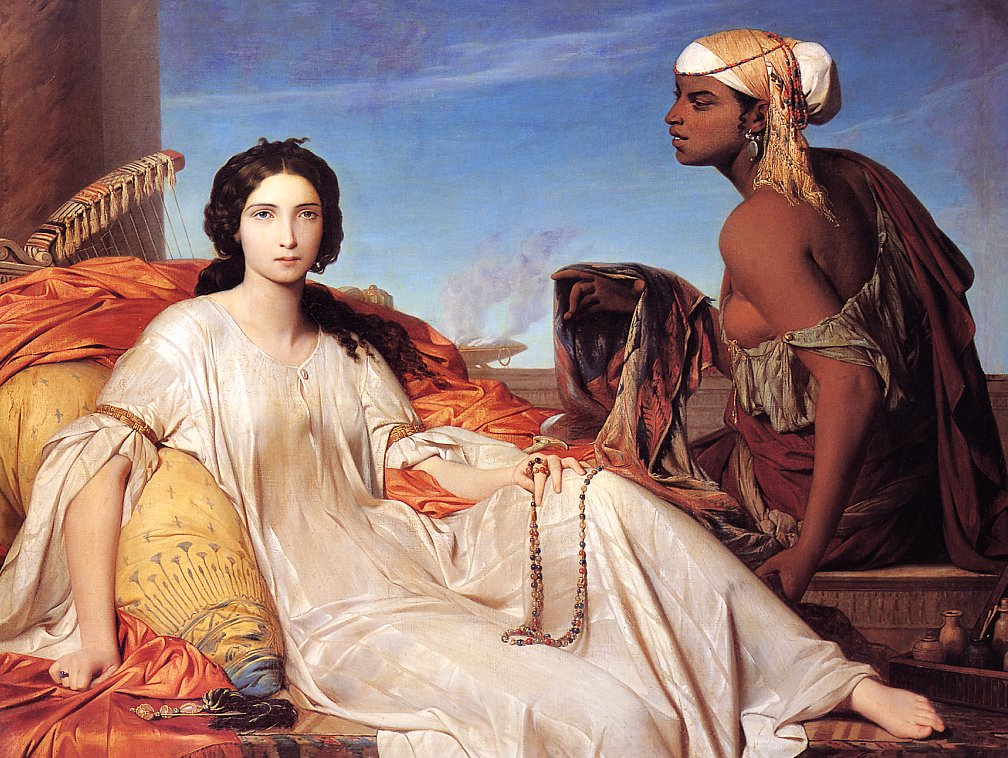
Esther à l'odalisque (1844), Musée des Beaux-Arts de Pau

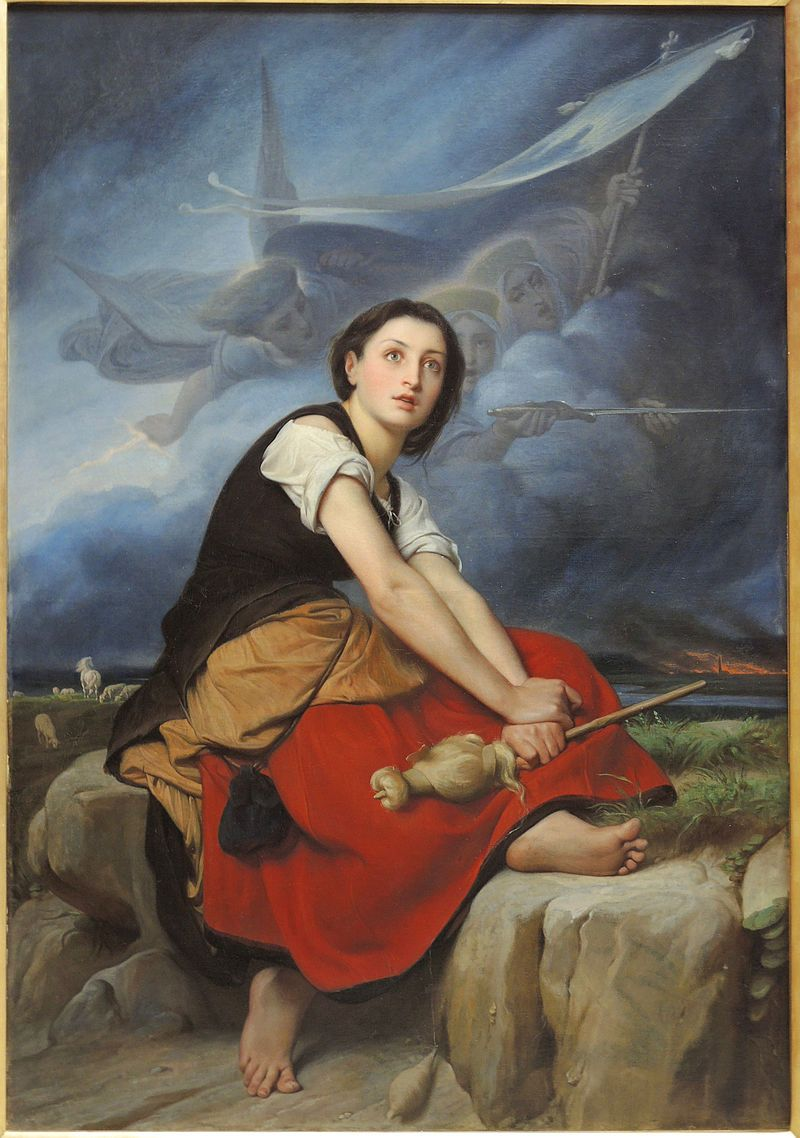
Joan of Arc hearing voices, Musée des Beaux-Arts de Rouen

Benouville was best known for his portraits, mythological and religious compositions in the Neoclassical and Orientalist style. He worked in oils, ink and chalk.

== Awards, prizes and honours ==
In 1845, Benouville, together with contemporary Alexandre Cabanel, was the recipient of the Prix des Beaux Arts for his painting, Jesus at the Pretorium.

== Select list of paintings ==
- Portrait of Leconte de Floris 1840
- Melancholy c. 1843
- Esther 1844
- The Mockery of Christ 1845
- The Wrath of Achilles 1847
- Christian Martyrs enter the Amphitheatre, c.1855

== Gallery ==
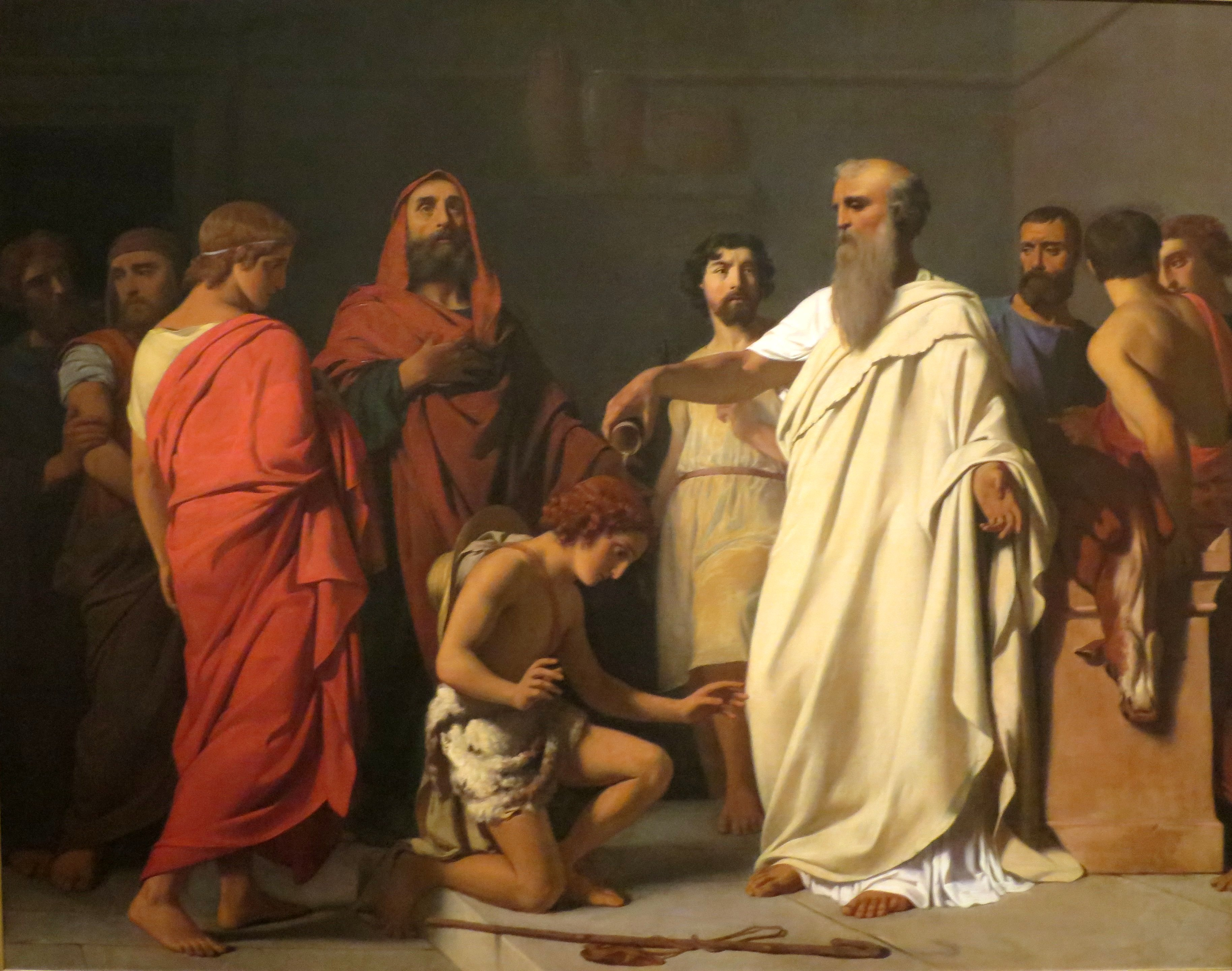
Samuel anoints David, 1842

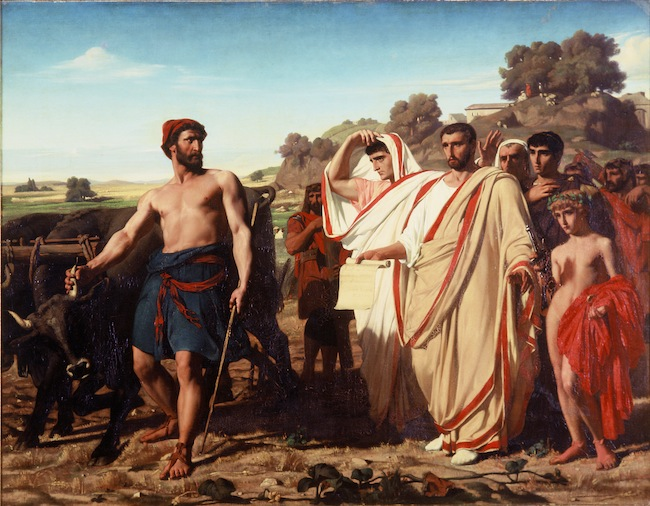
Cincinnatus Receives a Deputation from the Senate, 1844

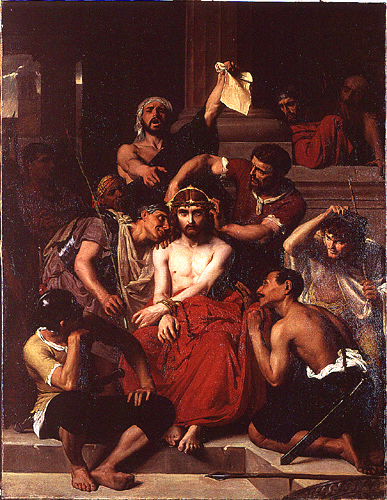
Jésus at the Pretorium, 1843, Musée d'Orsay, Paris

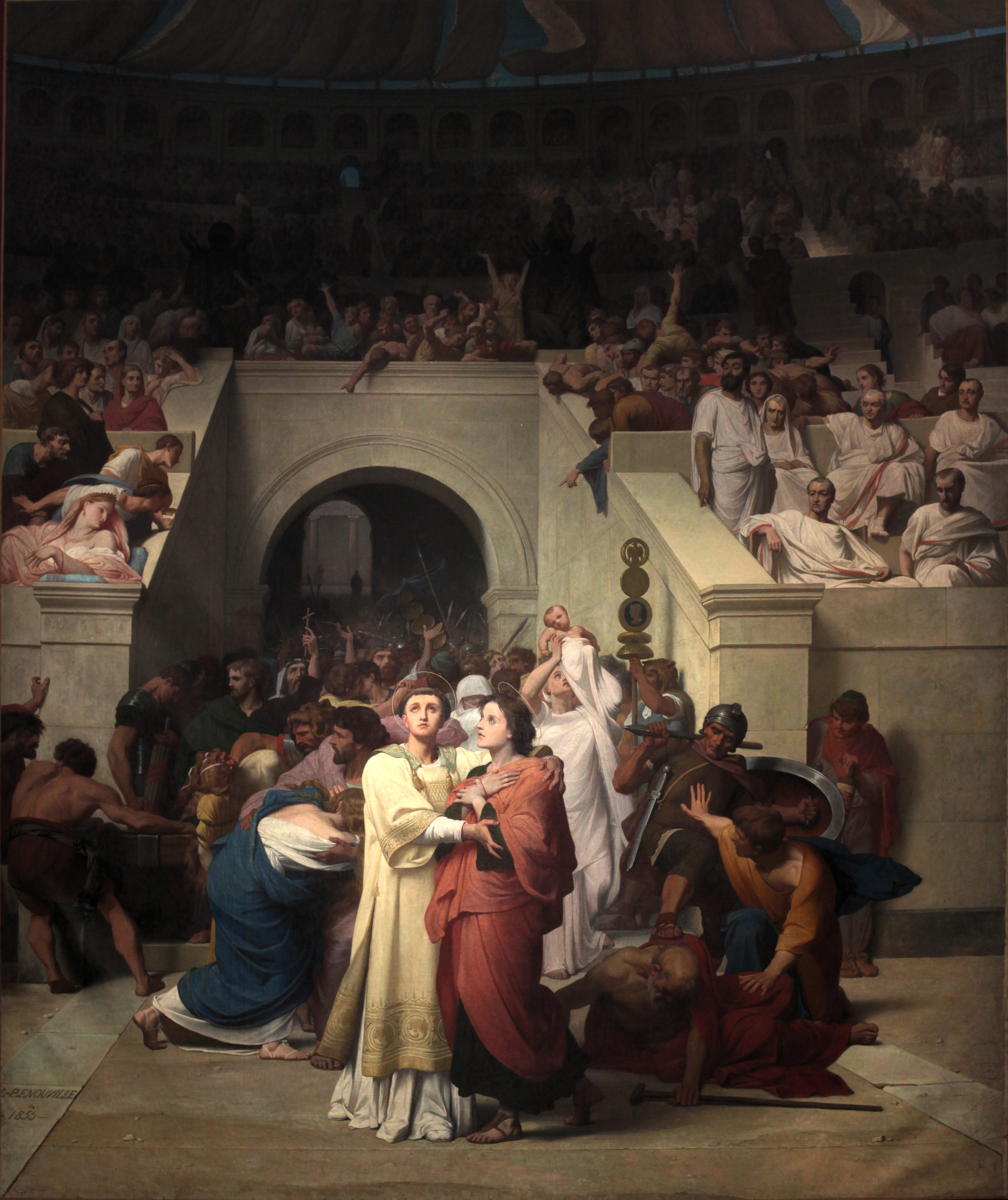
Christian Martyrs enter the Amphitheatre,
c. 1855, Musée d'Orsay, Paris

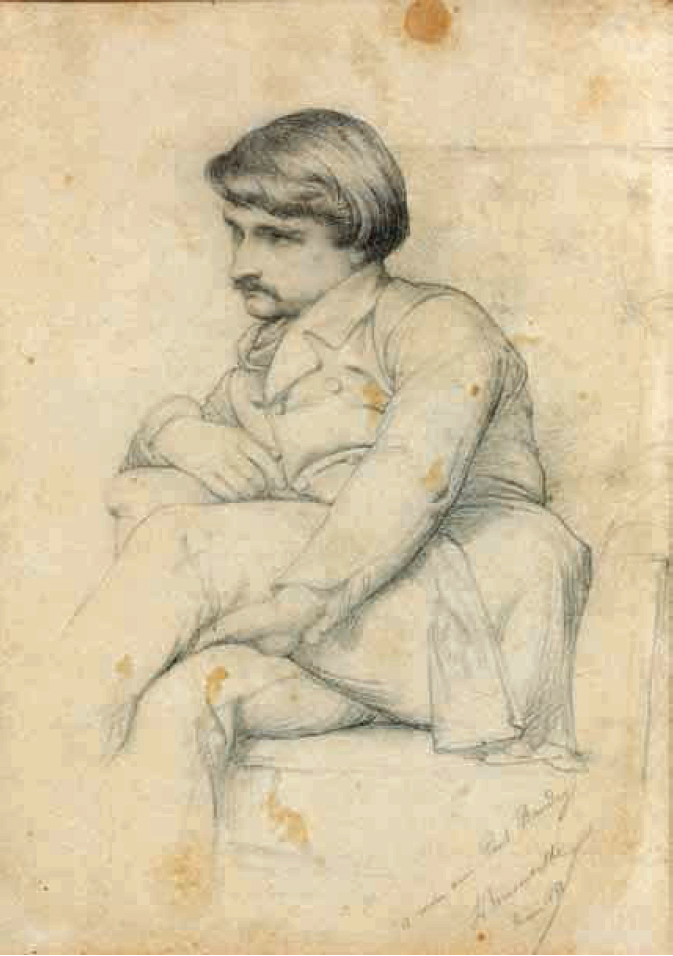
Portrait of Paul Baudry (French painter), c. 1855

== See also ==
List of Orientalist artists Orientalism
