= Édouard-Théophile Blanchard =

French painter

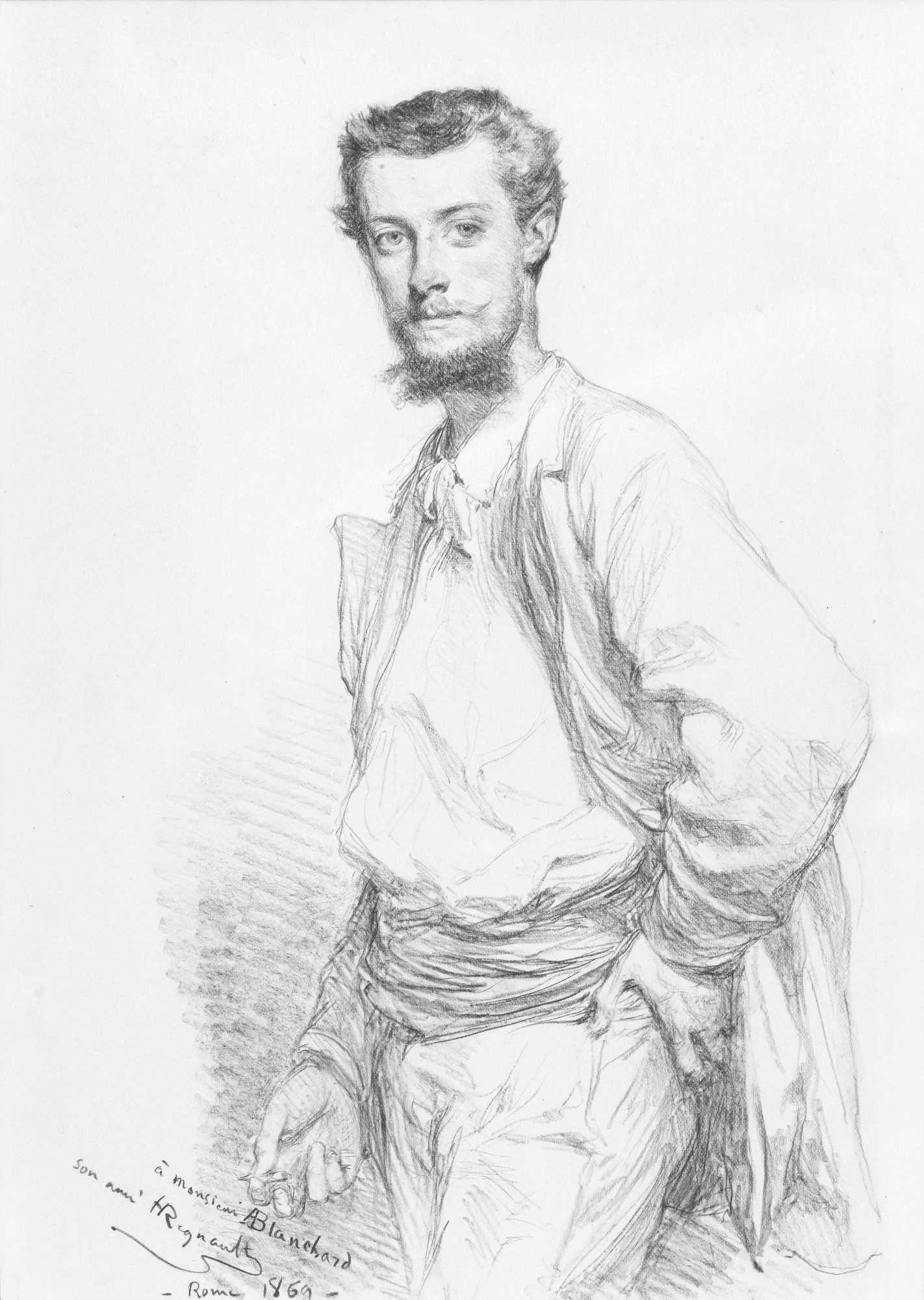
Edouard-Théophile Blanchard (Henri Regnault, 1869)

Édouard-Théophile Blanchard (18 November 1844 – 24 October 1879, Paris) was a French painter. He was a student of François-Édouard Picot and Alexandre Cabanel at the École des Beaux Arts.

Blanchard won the Prix de Rome scholarship in 1868.

His works included The Death of Astyanax (1868) at the École nationale supérieure des beaux-arts, Paris, Hylas Driven By the Nymbhs (1874) at the Musée des beaux-arts de Caen which would be destroyed in 1944 and Herodias (1874) at the Salon des artistes français (French Artist's Hall) as well as The Gods and the Mortals which was displayed at the École nationale supérieure des beaux-arts in Paris in 2004.

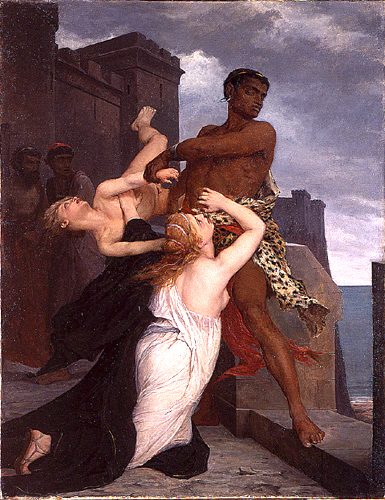
The Death of Astyanax (1868)

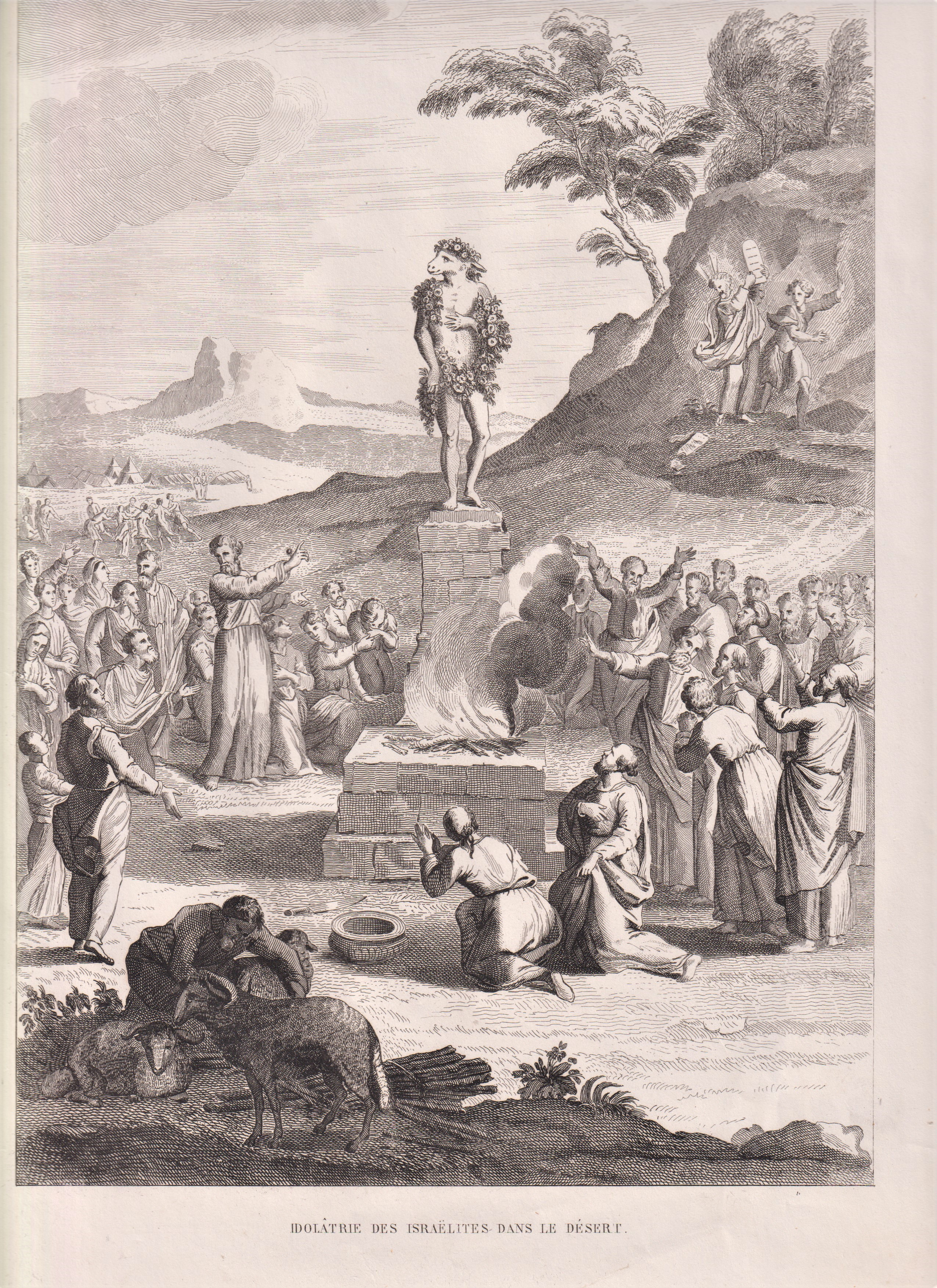
Idolatry of the Israelites in the desert, 1844, in the Jewish Museum of Switzerland’s collection.
