= Wandering Shadows (painting) =

Painting by Peter Graham

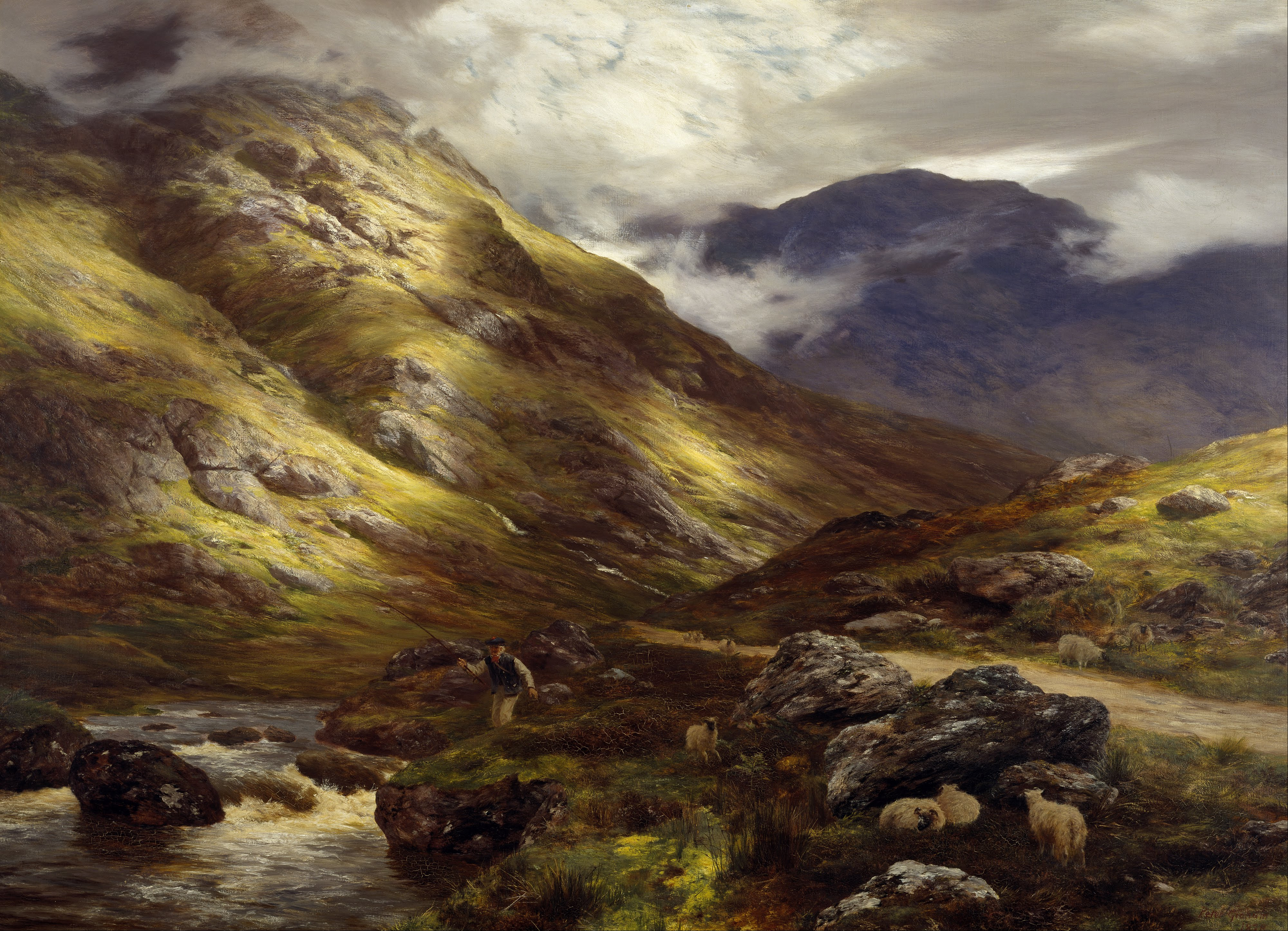
- Artist: Peter Graham
- Year: 1878
- Type: Oil on canvas, landscape painting
- Dimensions: 134.6 cm × 182.2 cm (53.0 in × 71.7 in)
- Location: Scottish National Gallery, Edinburgh

Wandering Shadows is an 1878 oil landscape painting by the British artist Peter Graham. It depicts a scene in the Scottish Highlands, capturing the very temporary affects of the atmospheric landscape with passing clouds and the gushing stream. The Scottish-born Graham enjoyed great success with such landscapes after relocating to England. The painting was displayed at the Royal Academy Exhibition of 1878 held at Burlington House in London. Today it is in the collection of the Scottish National Gallery in Edinburgh, having been acquired in 1944.

== Bibliography ==
- Errington, Lindsay. Master Class: Robert Scott Lauder and His Pupils. National Galleries of Scotland, 1983.
- Macdonald, Murdo. Scottish Art. Thames and Hudson, 2021.
