= Royal Academy Exhibition of 1878 =

1878 art exhibition in London

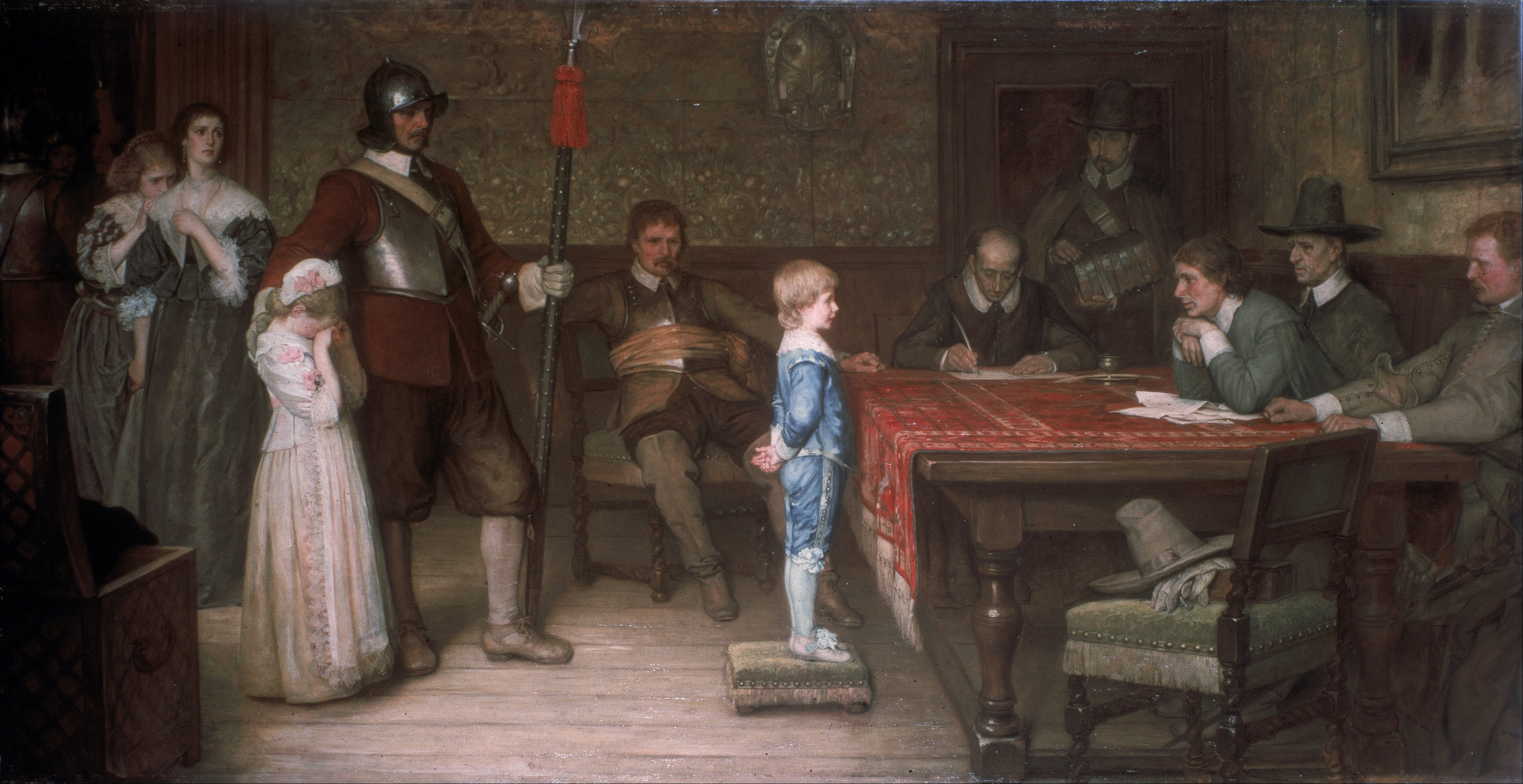
And When Did You Last See Your Father? by William Frederick Yeames

The Royal Academy Exhibition of 1878 was the an art exhibition held at Burlington House in Piccadilly. The annual Summer Exhibition of the British Royal Academy of Arts, it ran from 6 May to 5 August and attracted more than 300,000 spectators. The exhibition was in completion with one run by the new Grosvenor Gallery, with the writer Henry James preferring the latter.

Major attractions included William Powell Frith's The Road to Ruin, a series of five paintings in homage to William Hogarth and William Frederick Yeames' history painting, When Did You Last See Your Father?. John Everett Millais displayed his own historical scene The Princes in the Tower, but it was his depiction of the celebrated actress Lillie Langtry in his portrait A Jersey Lily that drew huge crowds. Edward Poynter, who would later succeed Millais as President of the Royal Academy, submitted his own portrait featuring Langtry.

Poynter's other painting Zenobia Captive earned enthusiastic praise from critics. The American artist Winslow Homer's The Cotton Pickers was displayed by its owner.

== Gallery ==
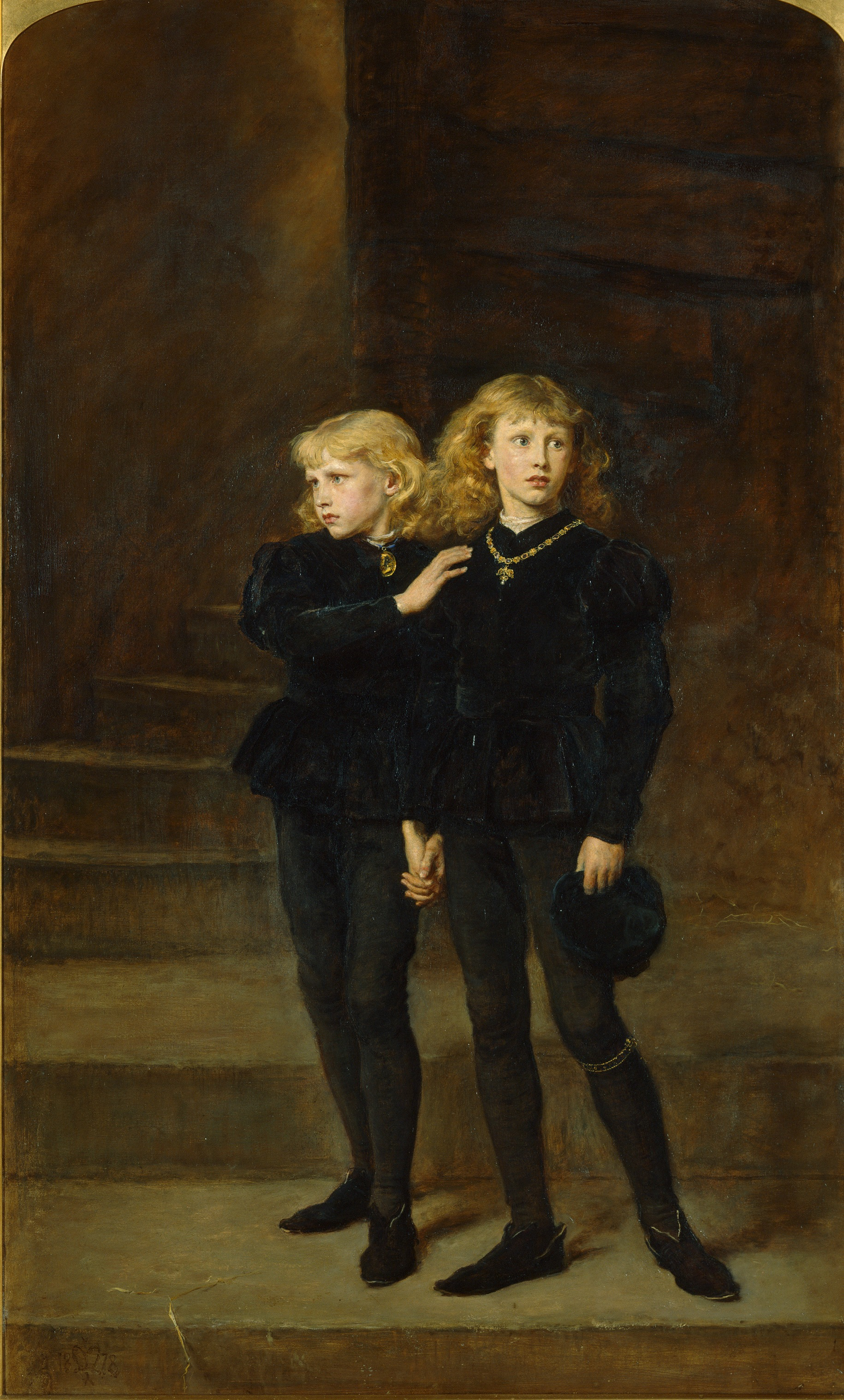
The Princes in the Tower by John Everett Millais

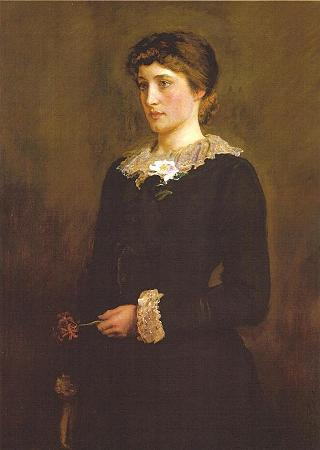
A Jersey Lily by John Everett Millais

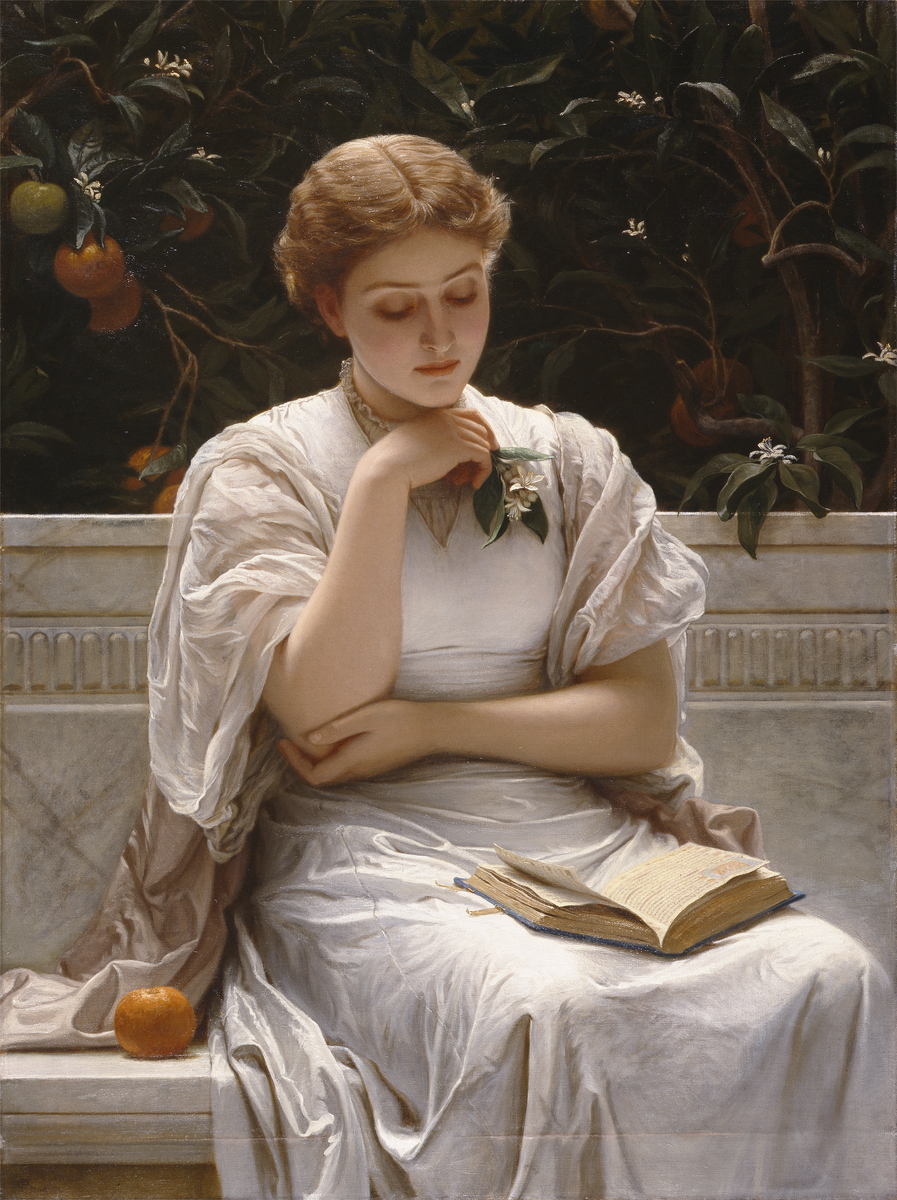
Girl Reading by Charles Edward Perugini

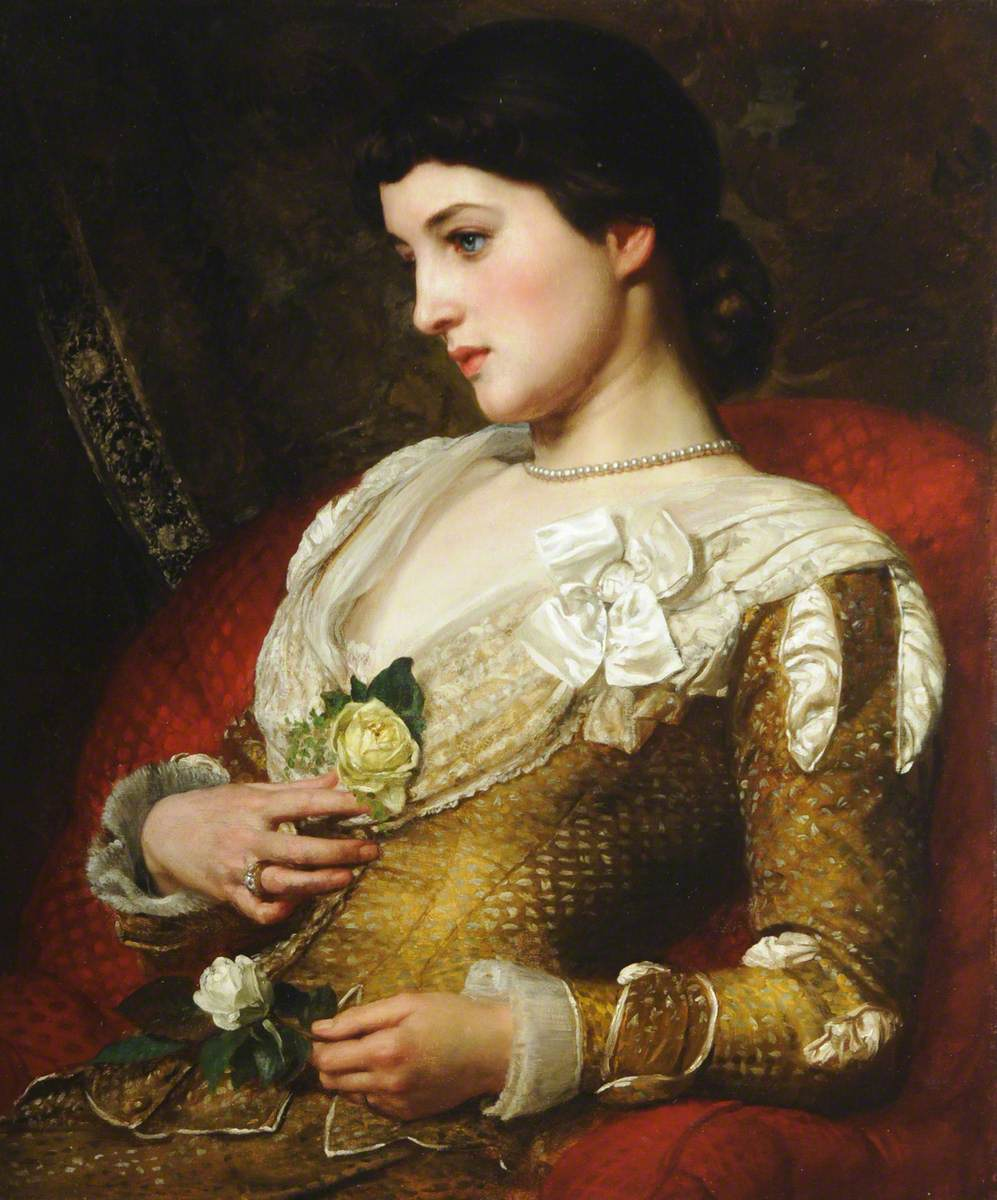
Lillie Langtry by Edward Poynter

Zenobia Captive by Edward Poynter

The Hour by John Pettie

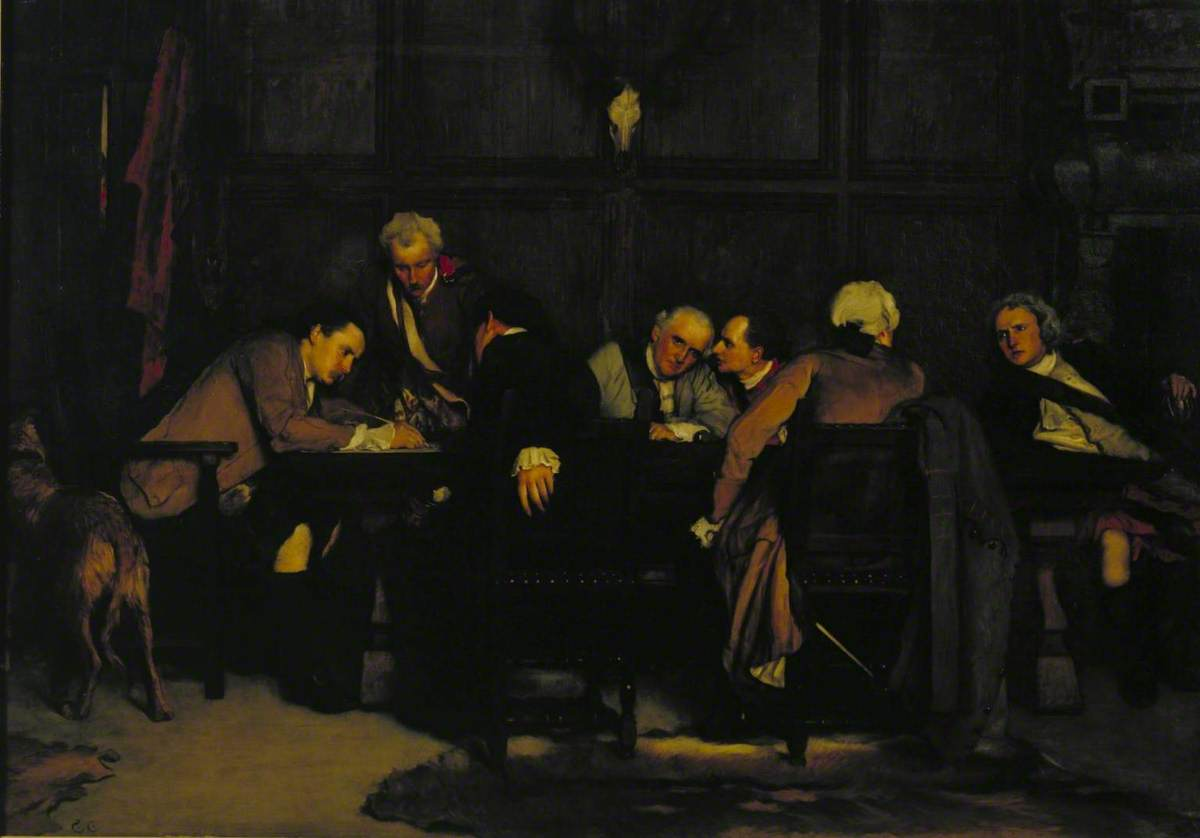
Meeting of Scottish Jacobites by Claude Andrew Calthrop

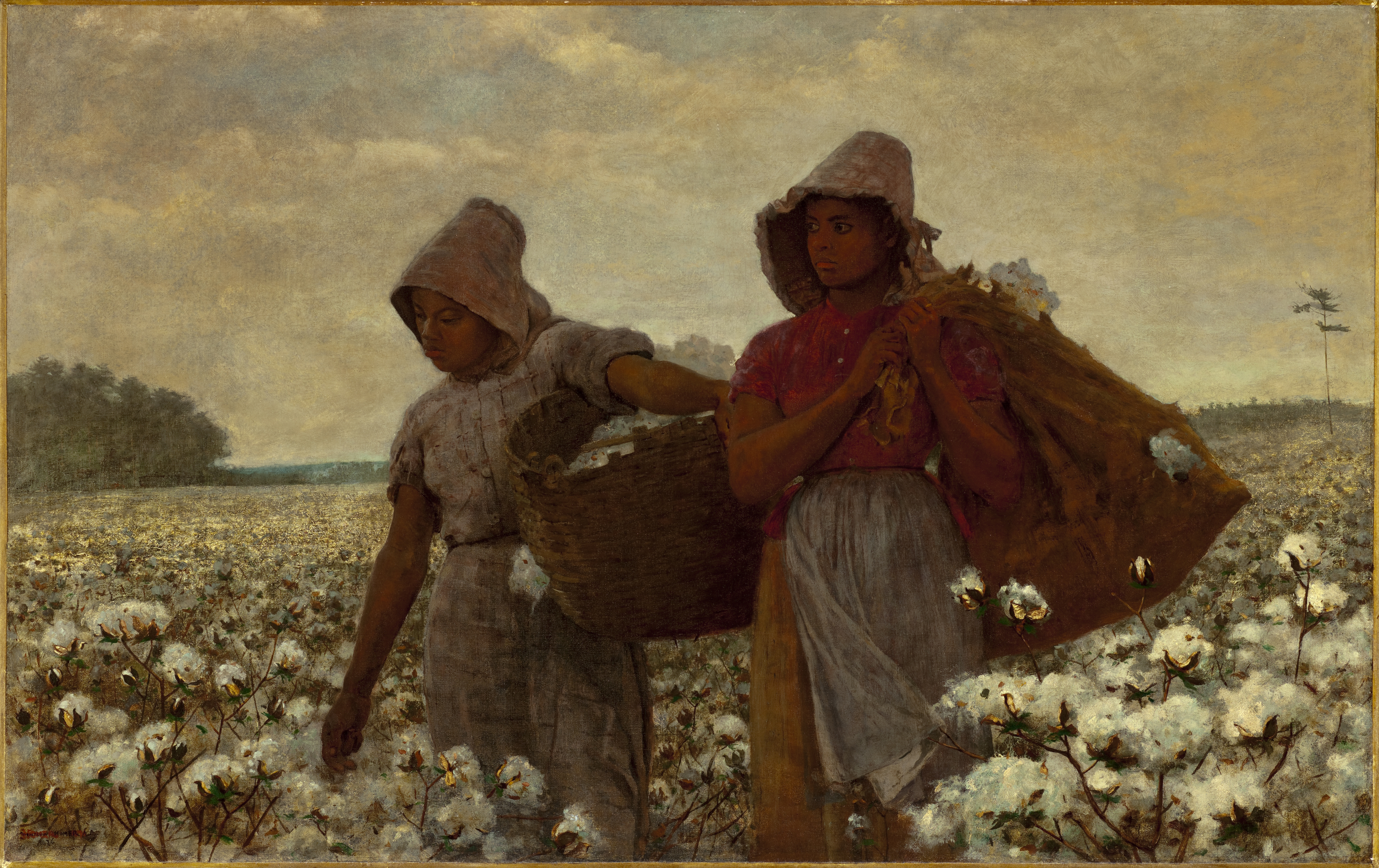
The Cotton Pickers by Winslow Homer

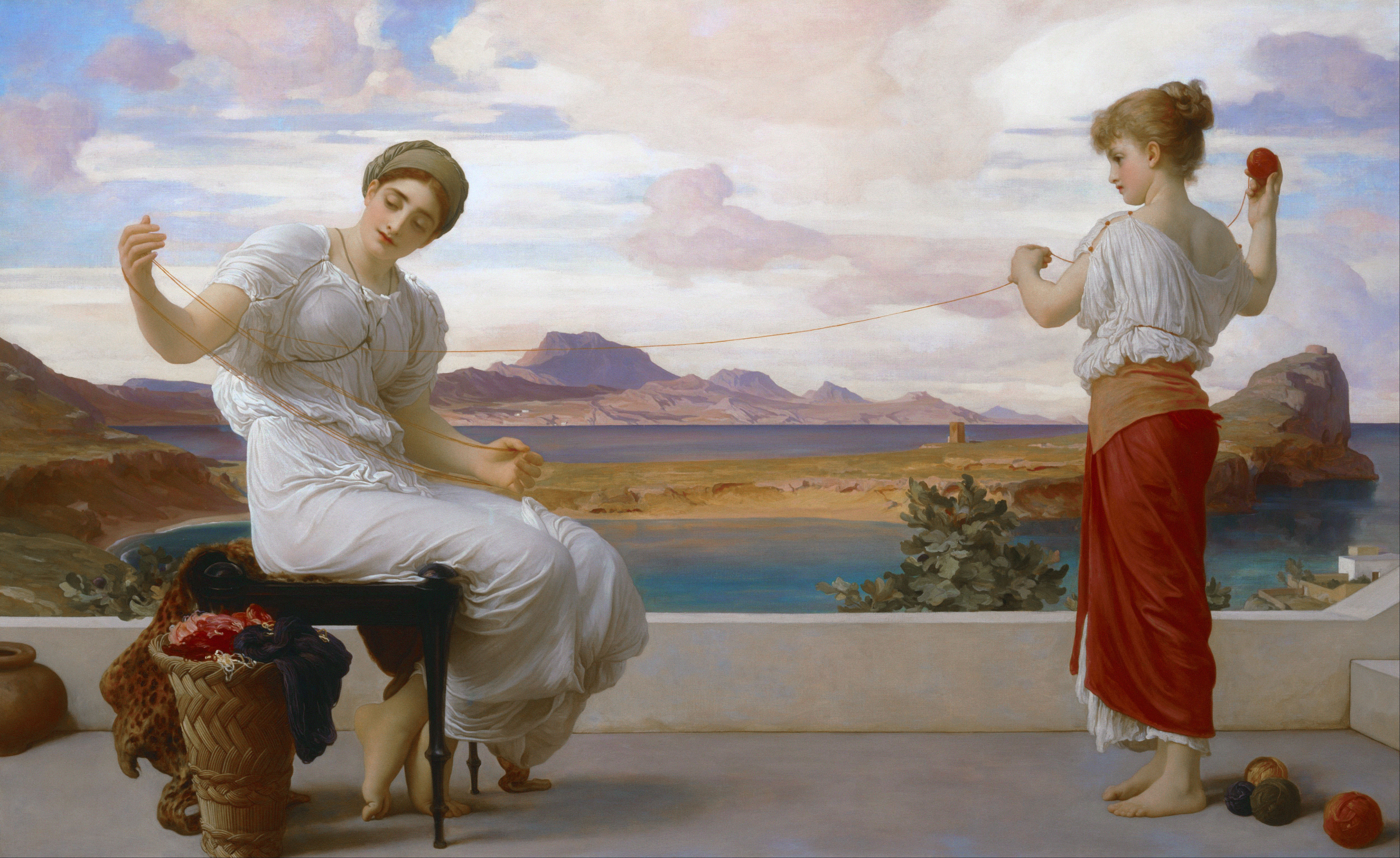
Winding the Skein by Frederic Leighton

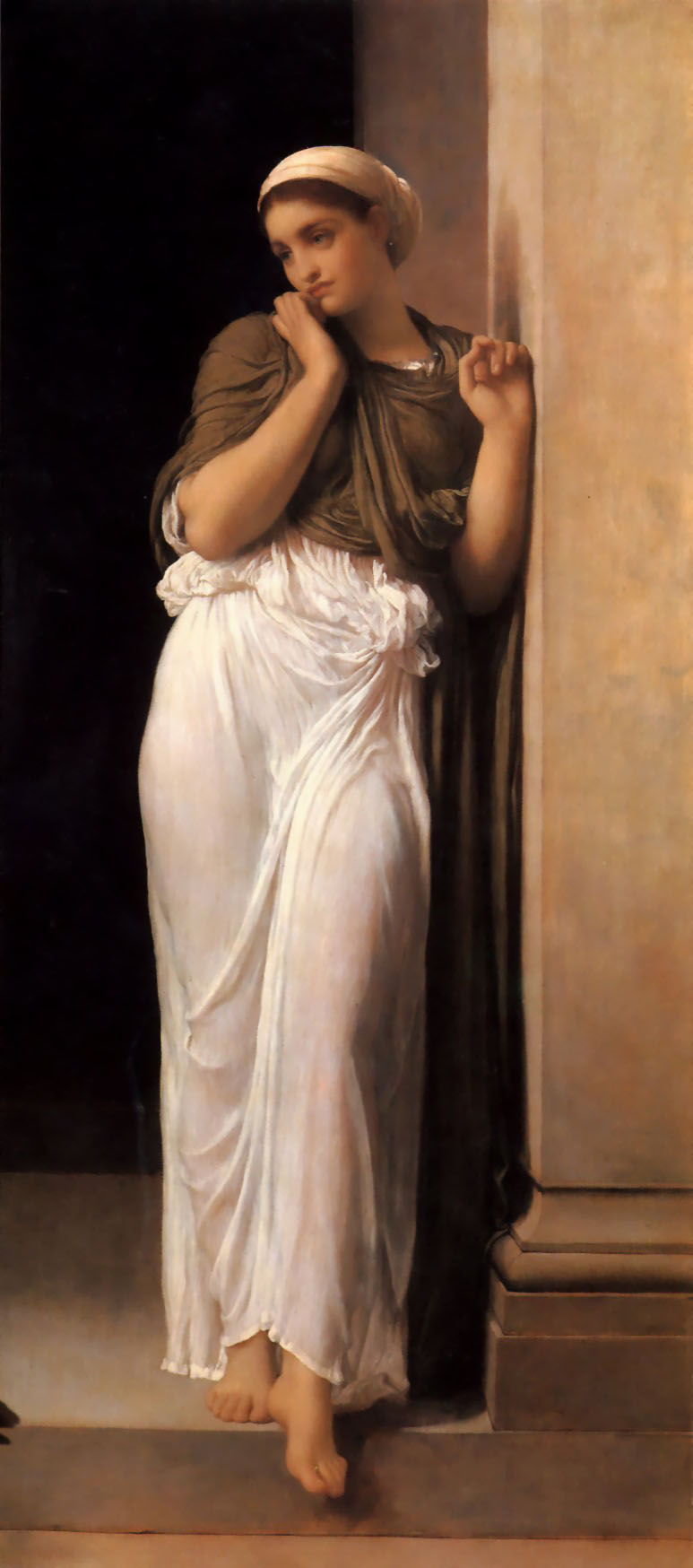
Nausicaa by Frederic Leighton

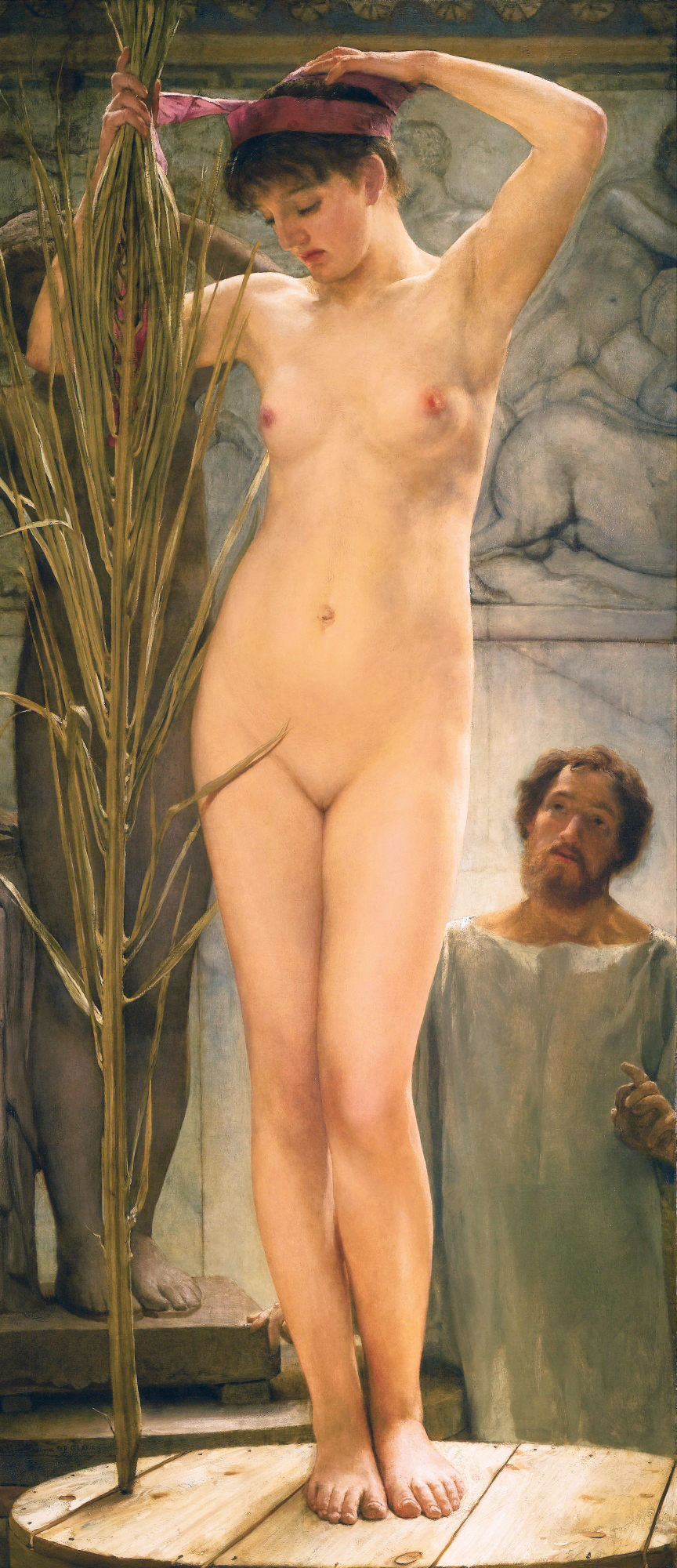
A Sculptor's Model by Lawrence Alma-Tadema

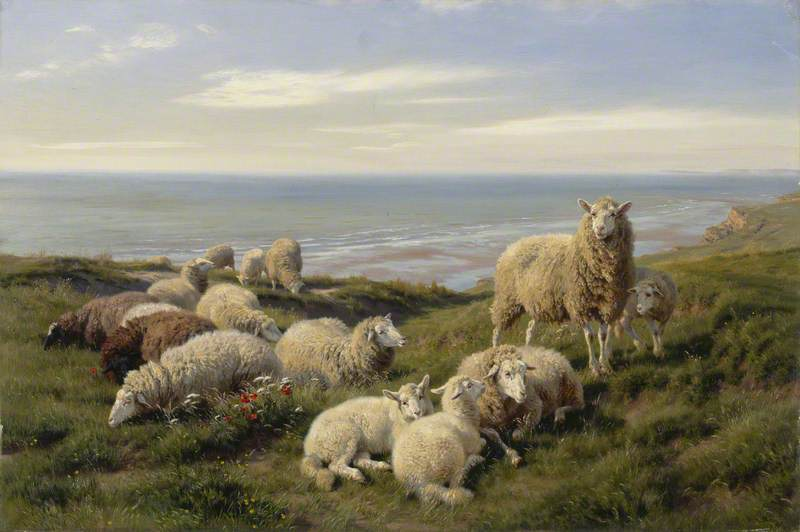
Afternoon on the Cliffs by Henry William Banks Davis

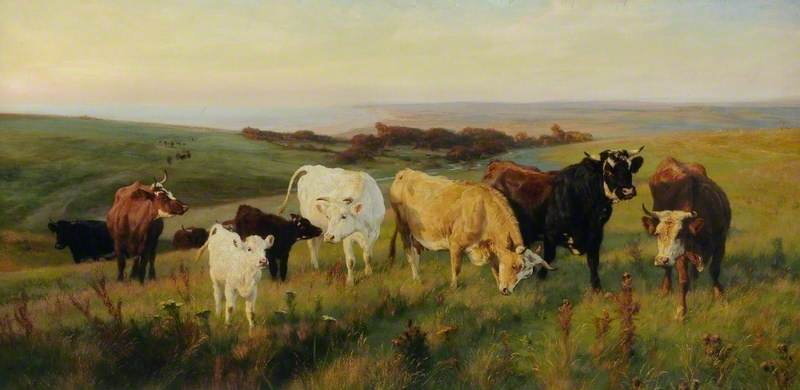
Evening Light by Henry William Banks Davis

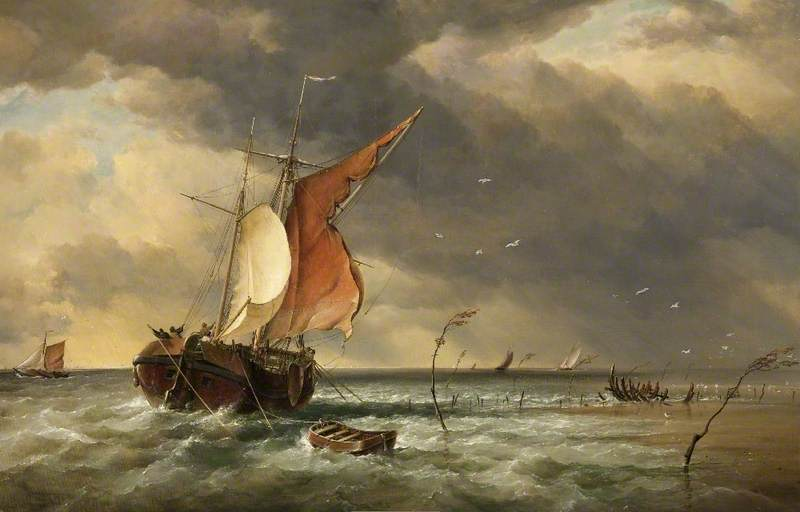
A Dutch Galliot Aground on a Sandbank on the Biesbosch by Edward William Cooke

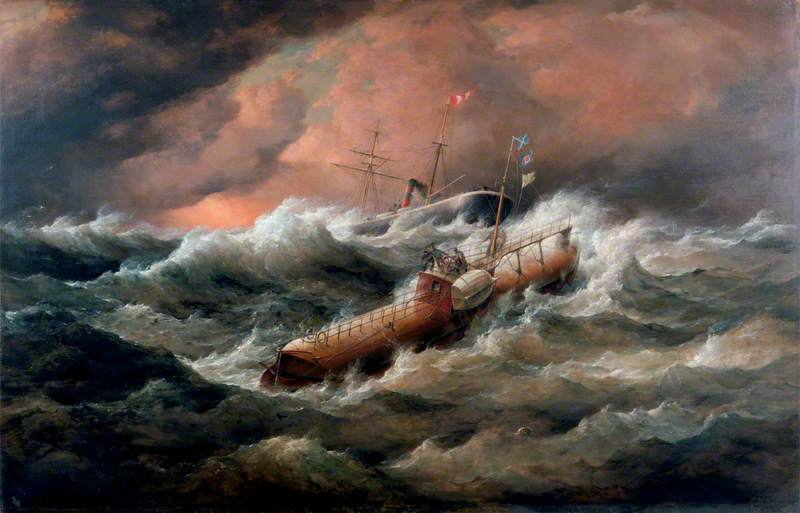
The Cleopatra in the Bay of Biscay by Edward William Cooke

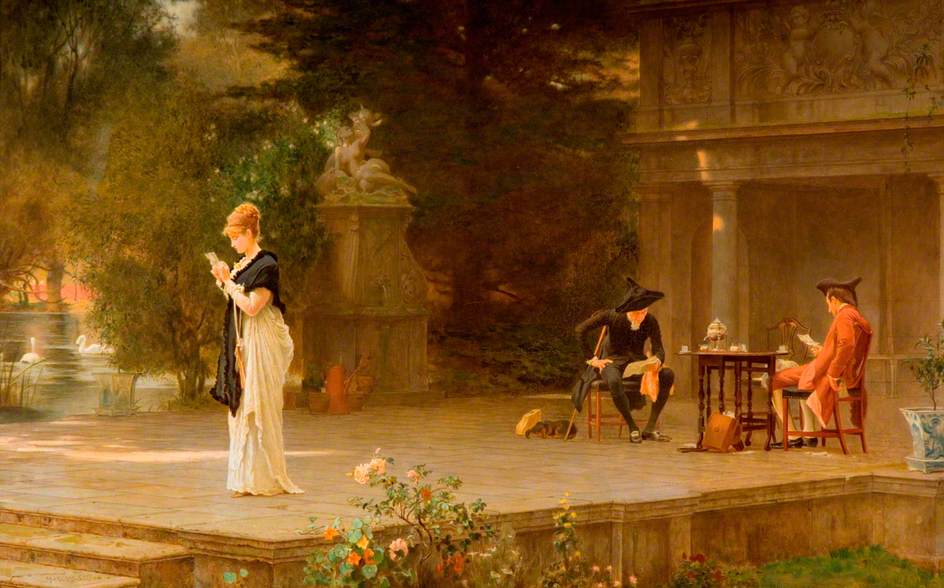
The Post Bag by Marcus Stone

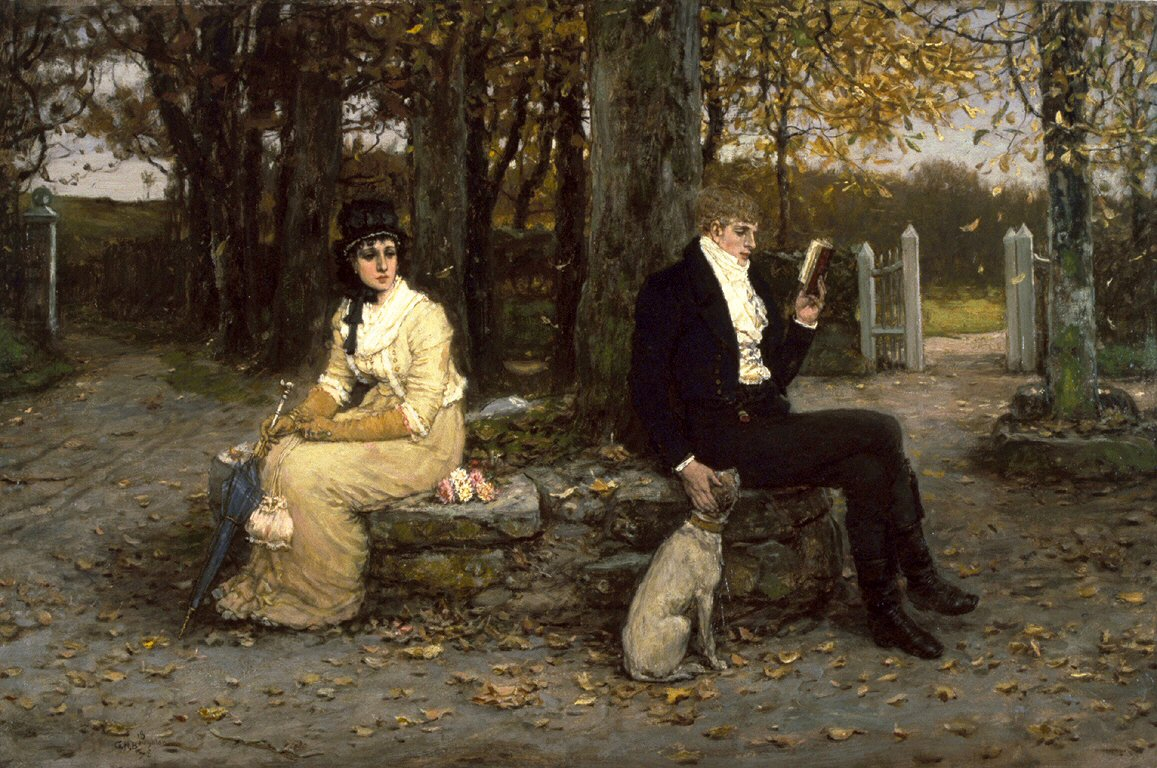
The Waning Honeymoon by George Henry Boughton

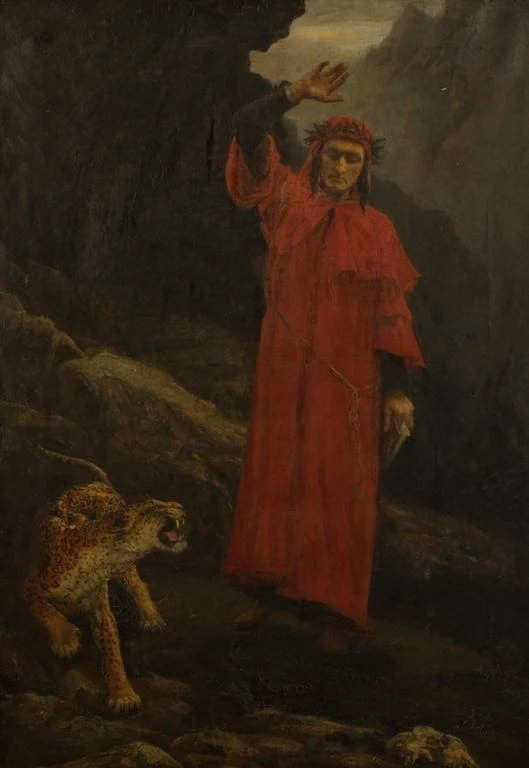
Dante and the Leopard by John Macallan Swan

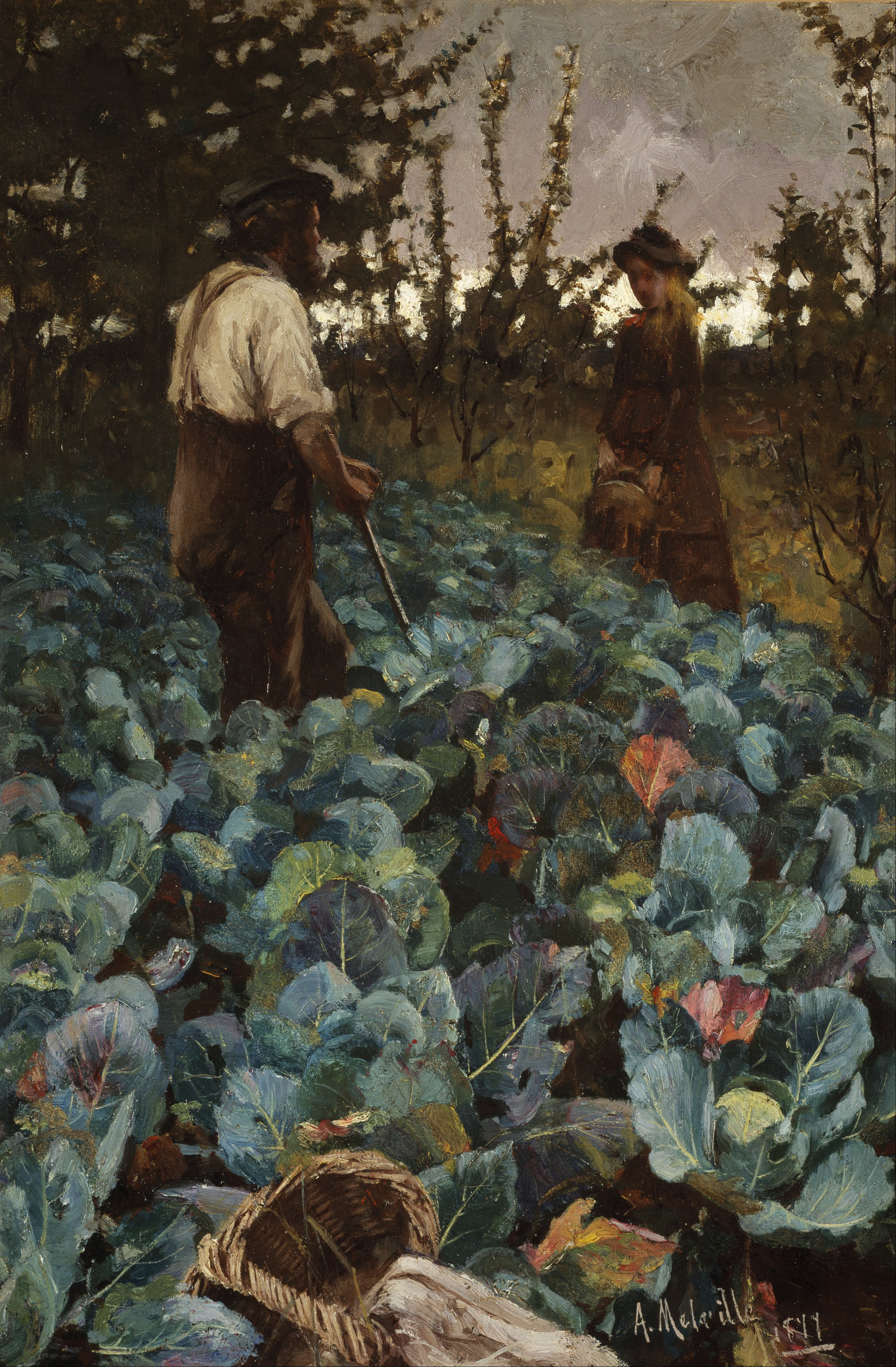
A Cabbage Garden by Arthur Melville

John Alden and Priscilla by Alfred Elmore

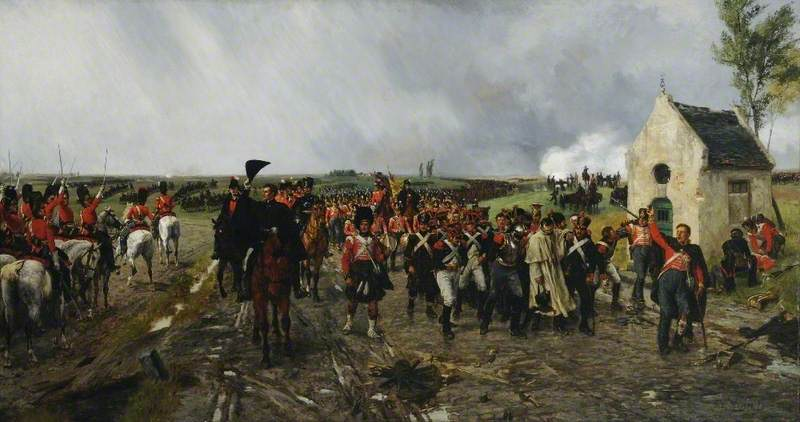
Wellington's March from Quatre Bras to Waterloo by Ernest Crofts

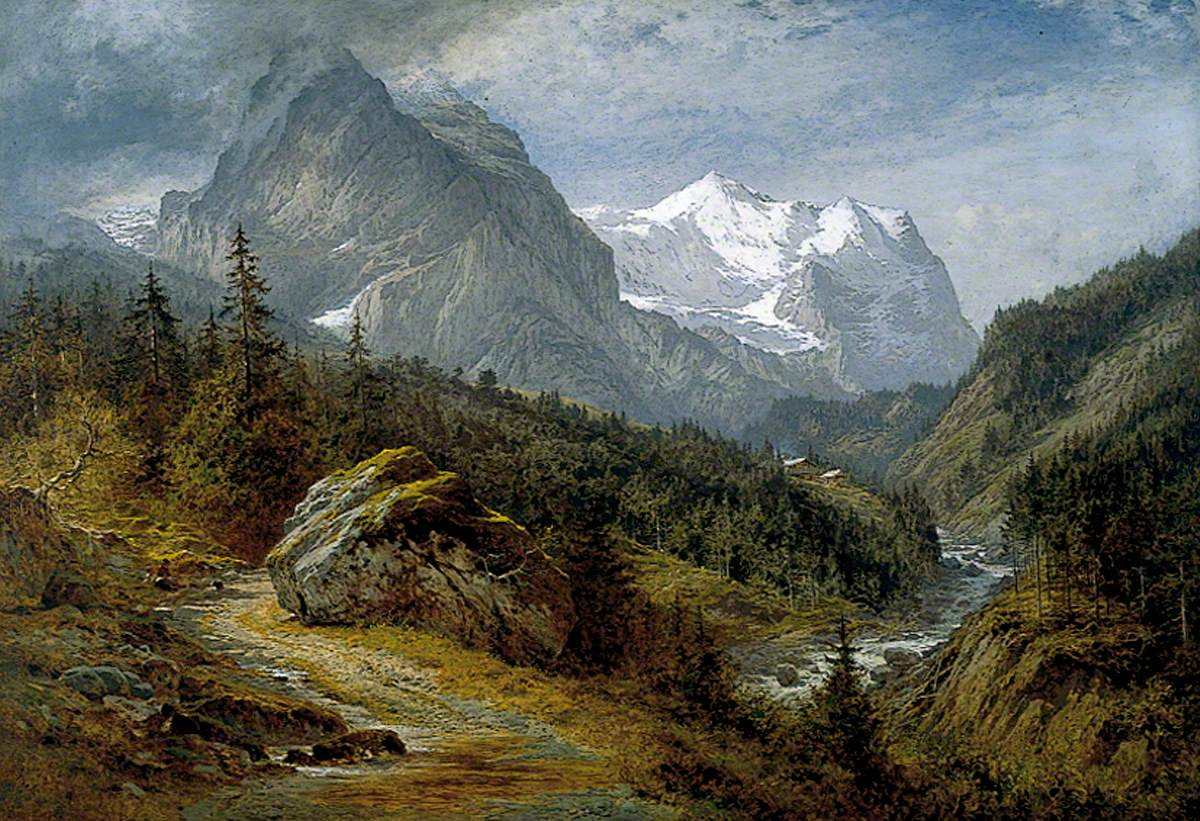
Autumn in Switzerland by Benjamin Williams Leader

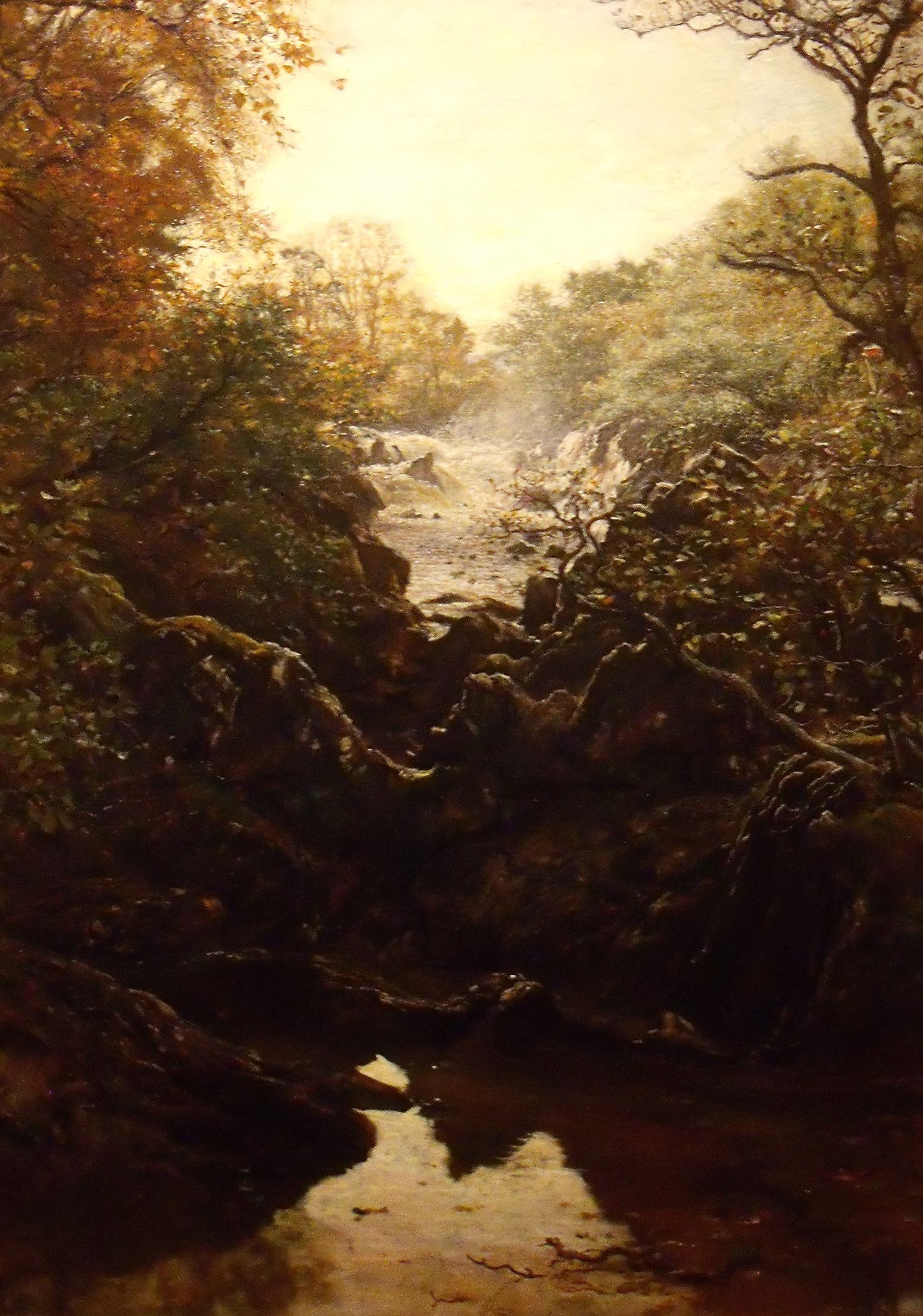
Saint Martin's Summer by John Everett Millais

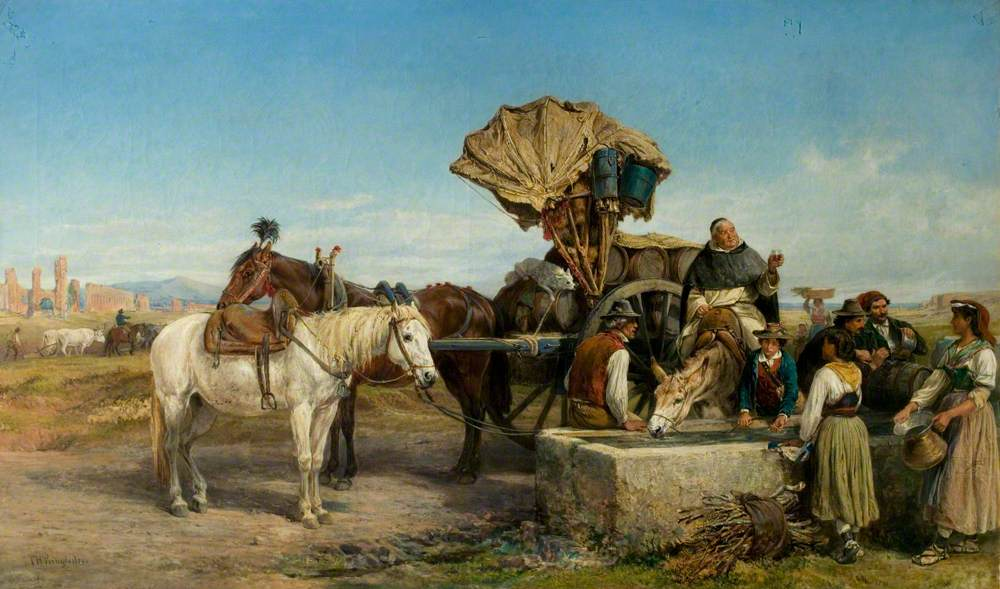
Wine Cart, the Roman Campagna by Charles H. Poingdestre

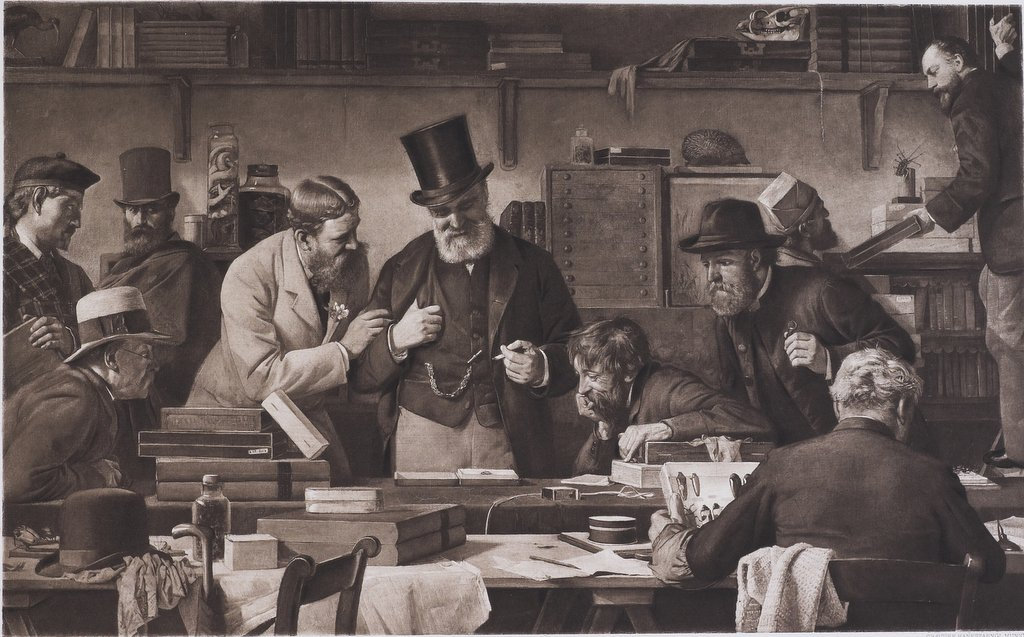
After an Entomological Sale by Edward Armitage

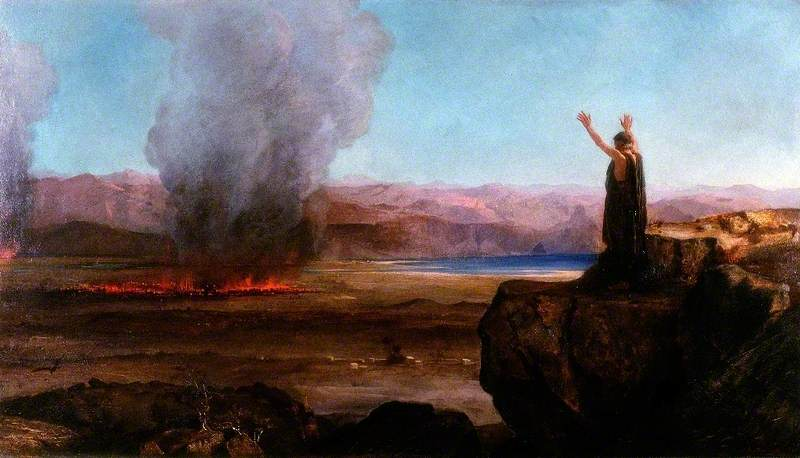
The Cities of the Plain by Edward Armitage

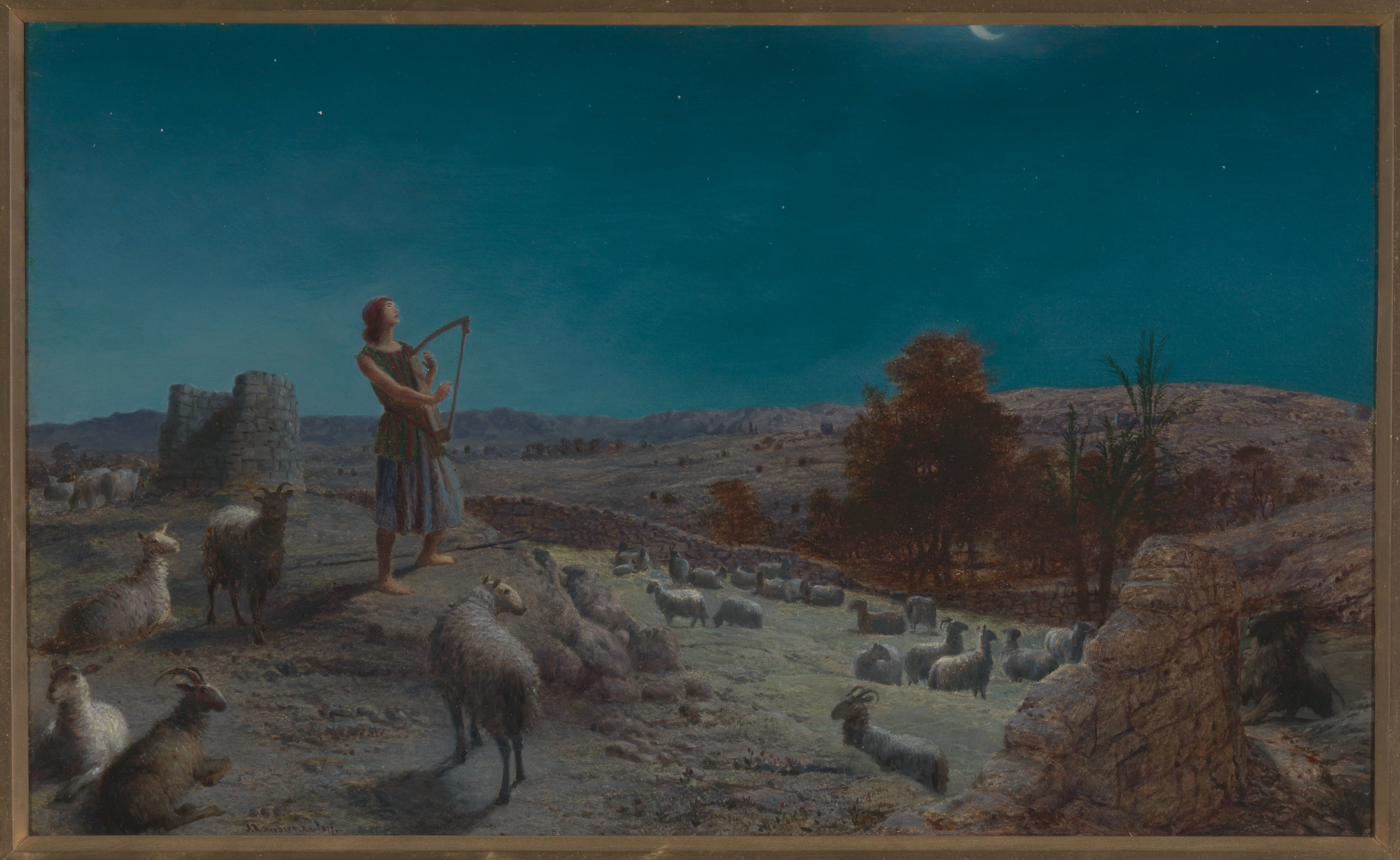
David, the Future King of Israel, While a Shepherd at Bethlehem by John Rogers Herbert

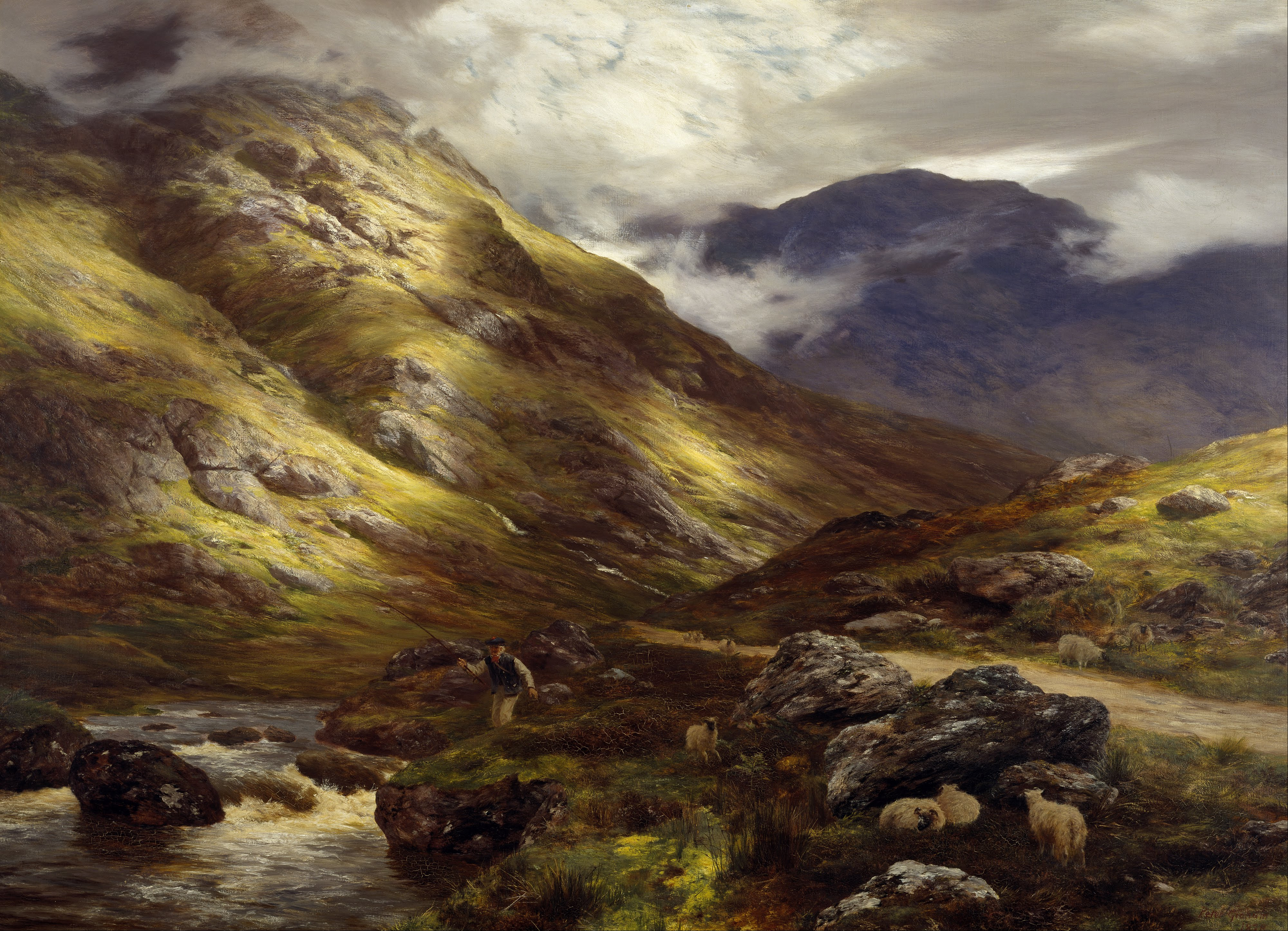
Wandering Shadows by Peter Graham

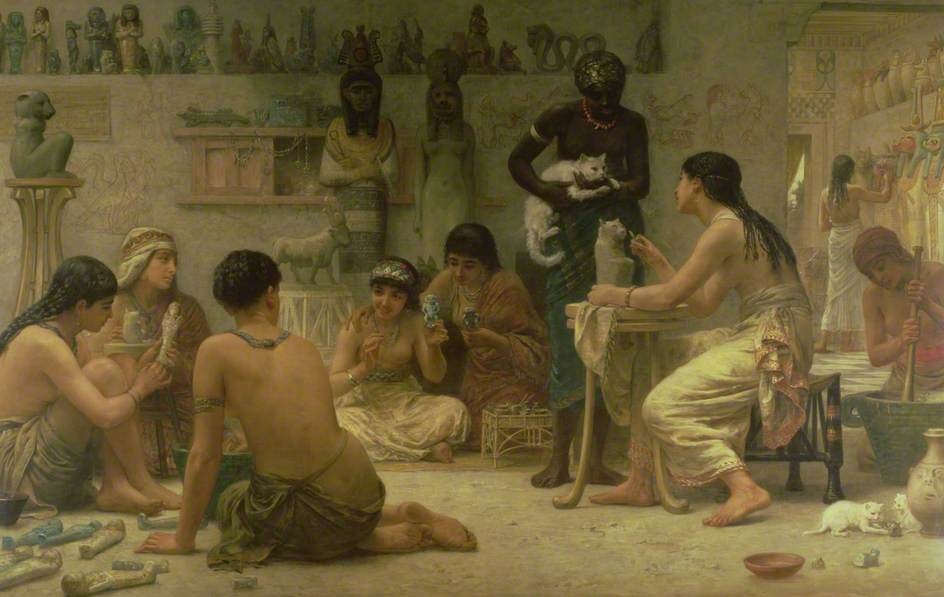
The Gods and Their Makers by Edwin Long

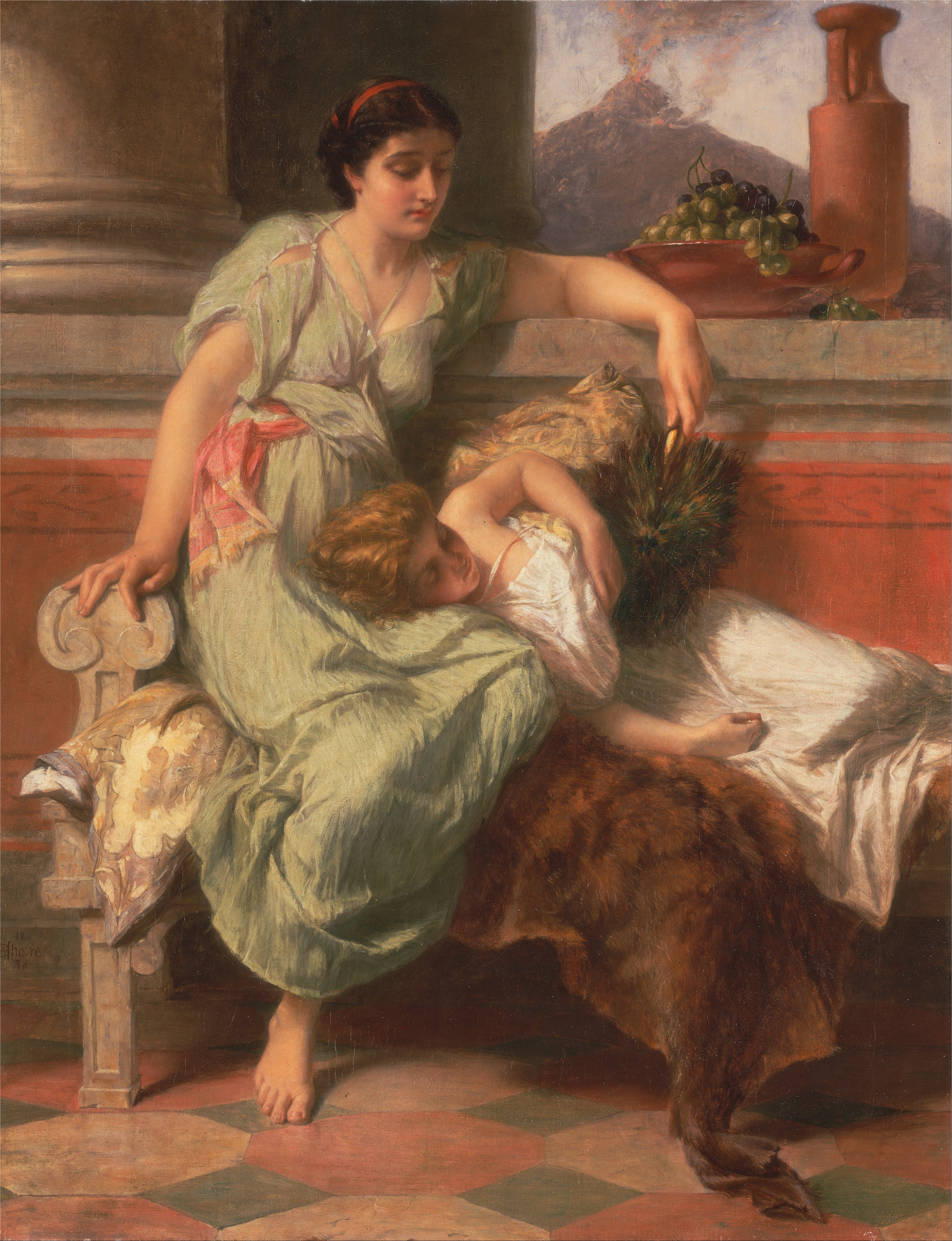
Pompeii, A.D. 79 by Alfred Elmore

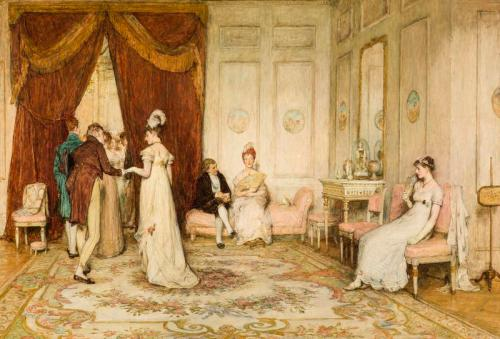
A Social Eddy by William Quiller Orchardson

News from the Front, by Andrew Carrick Gow

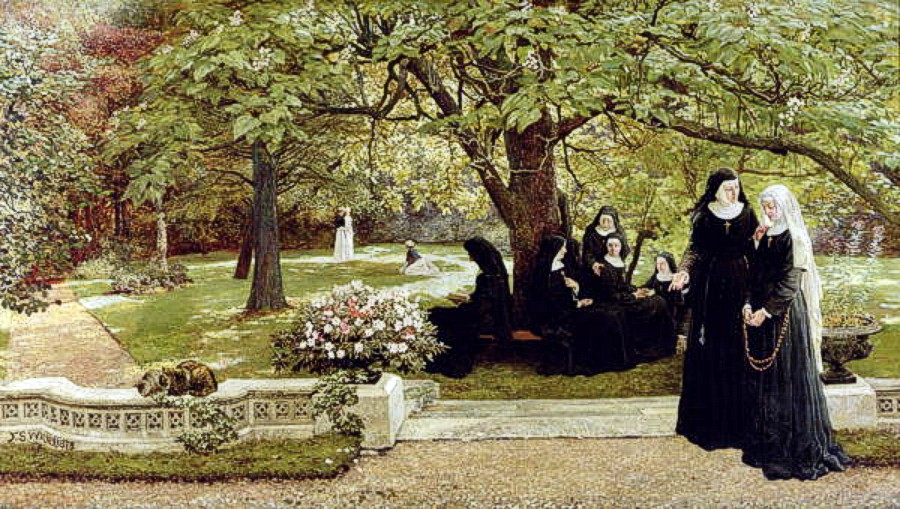
The Convent Garden by Francis S. Walker

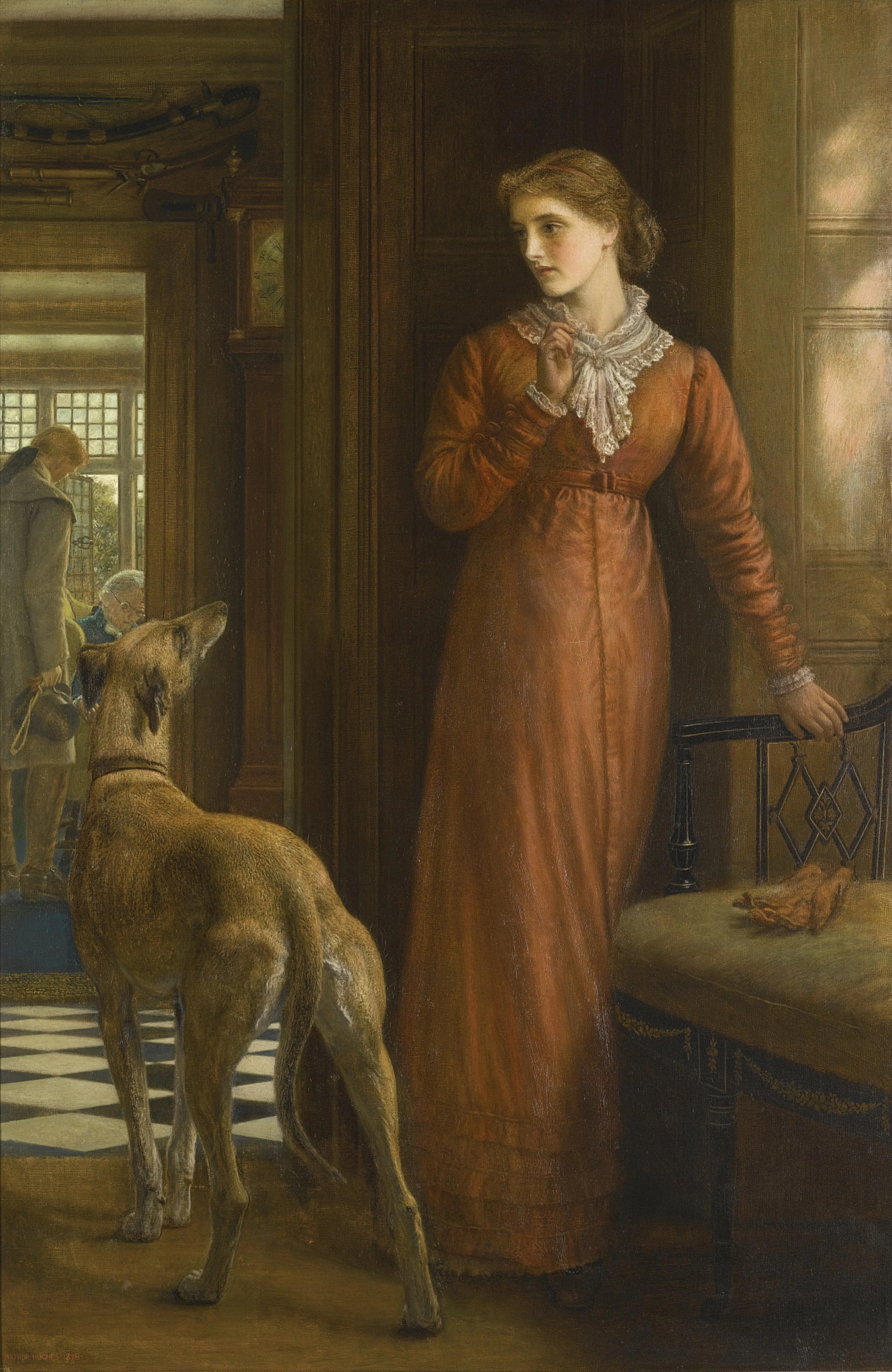
Uncertainty by Arthur Hughes

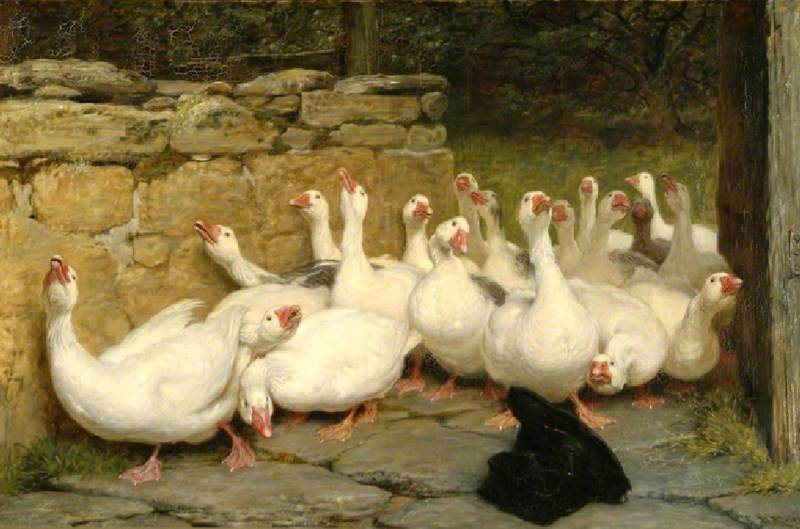
An Anxious Moment by Briton Riviere

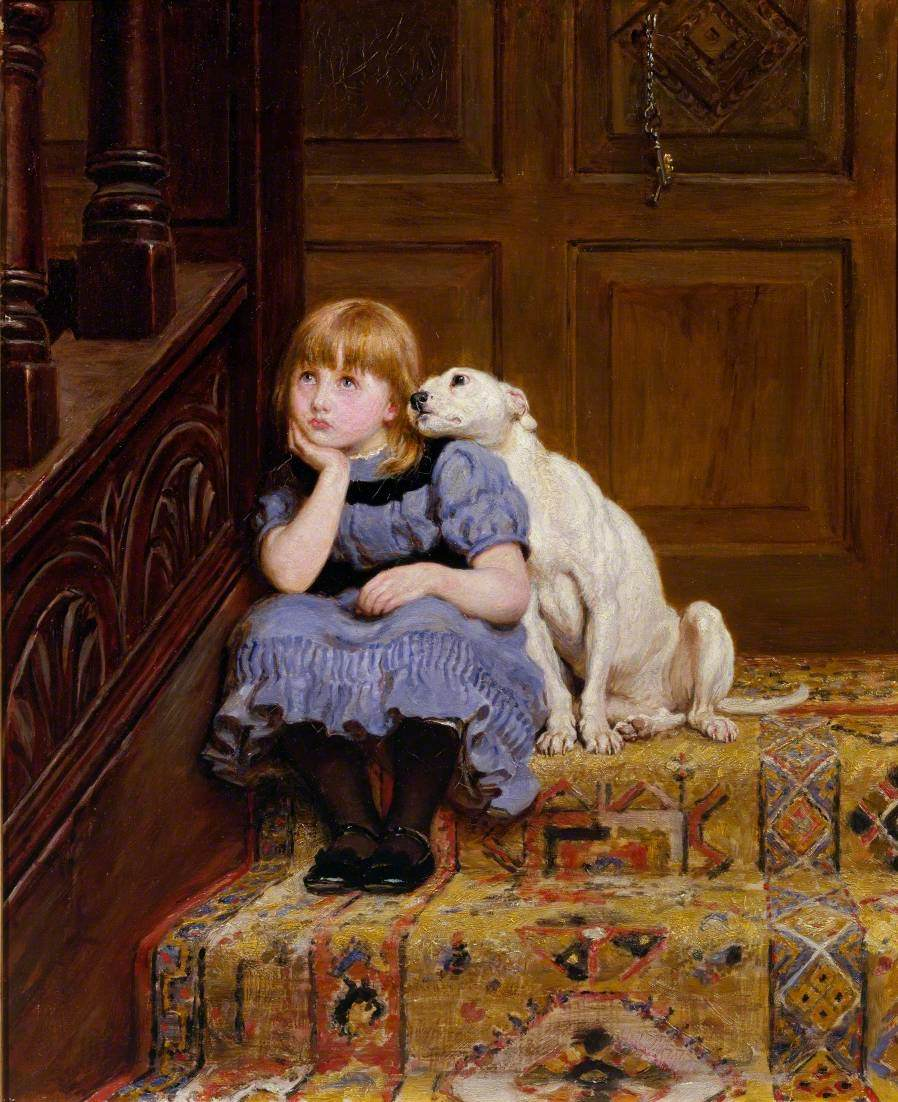
Sympathy by Briton Riviere

Lazy Moments by John Sargeant Noble

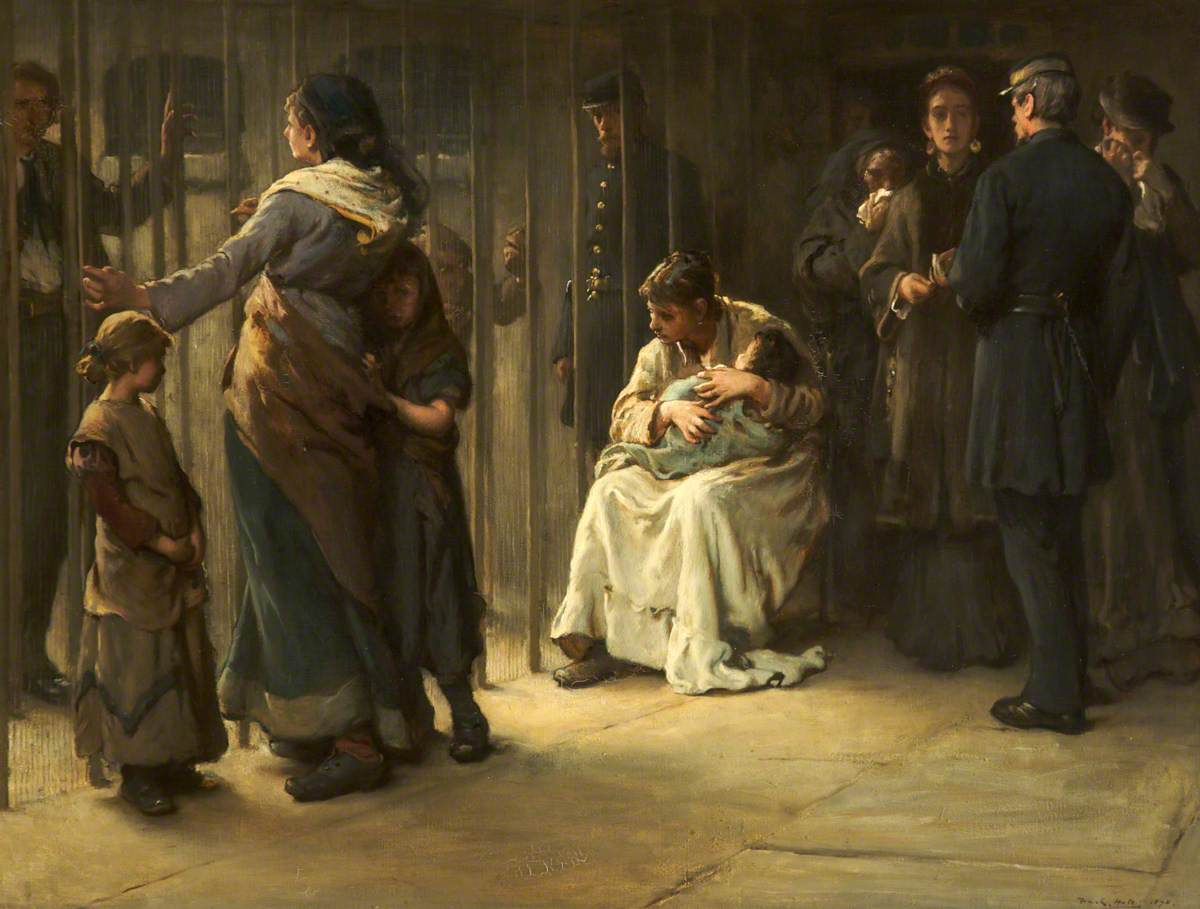
Newgate, Committed for Trial by Frank Holl

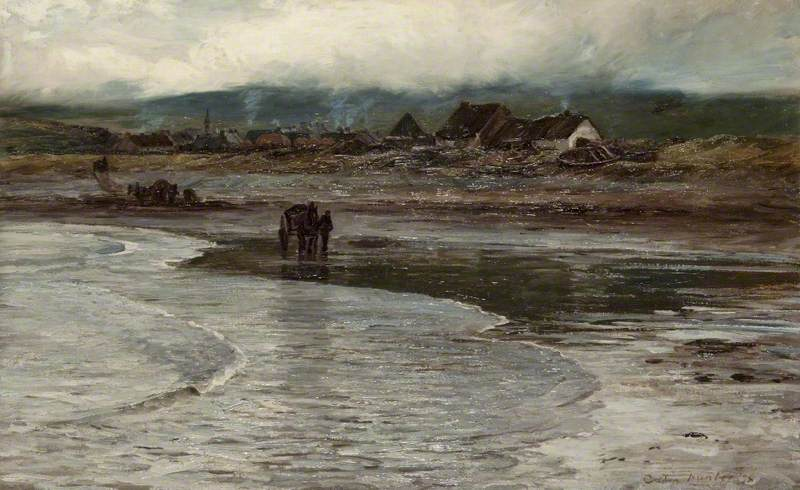
Ebbing Tide by Colin Hunter

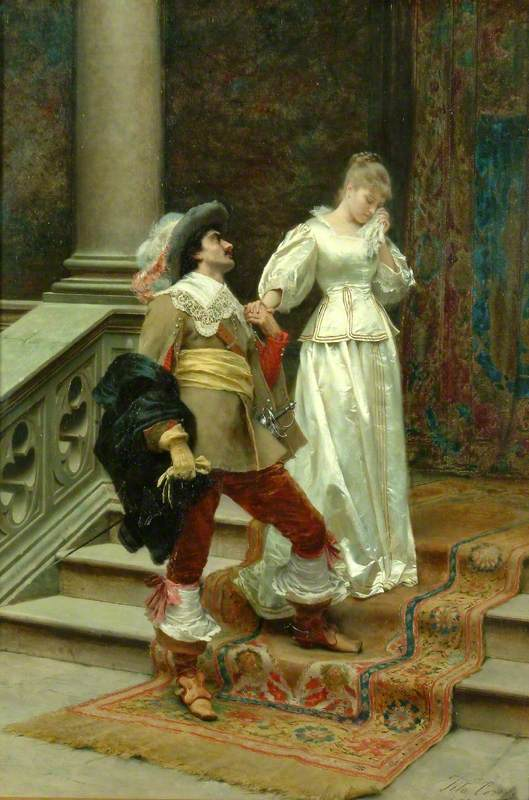
Goodbye by Tito Conti

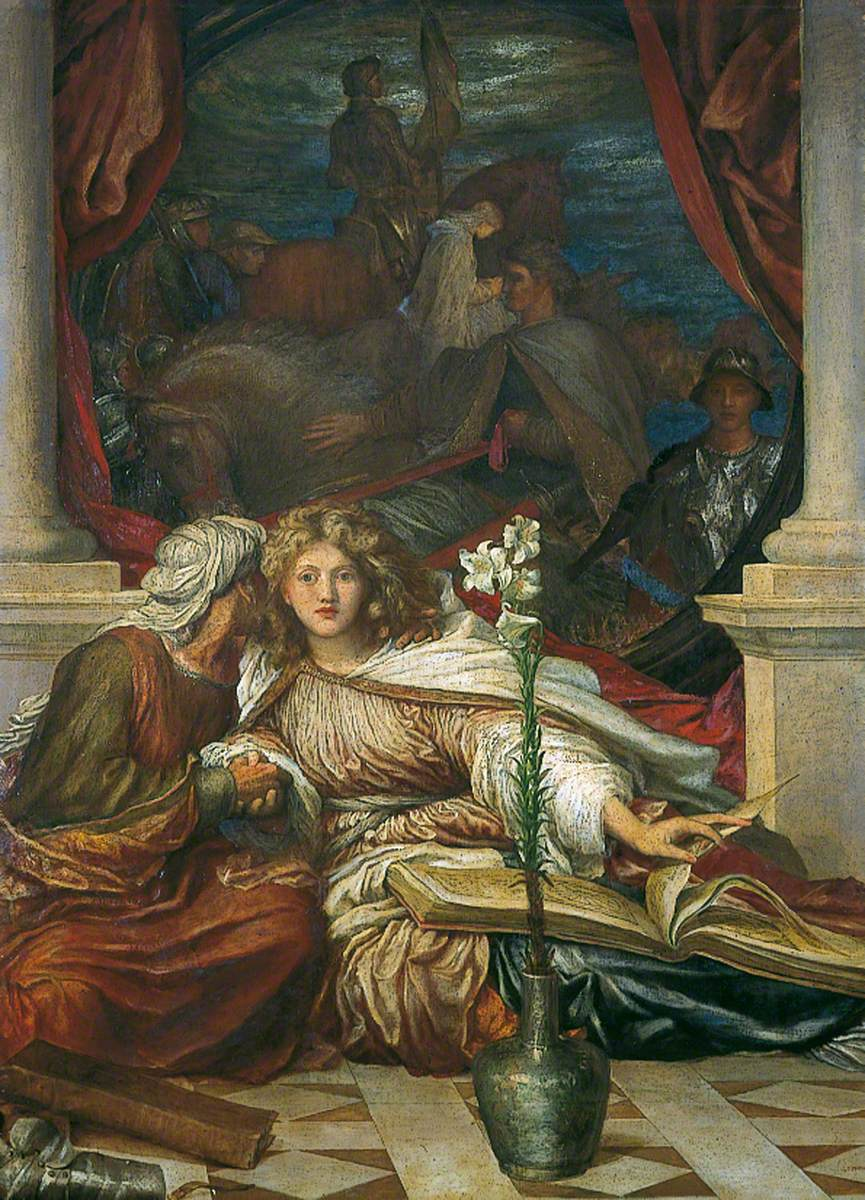
Britomart and Her Nurse by George Frederic Watts

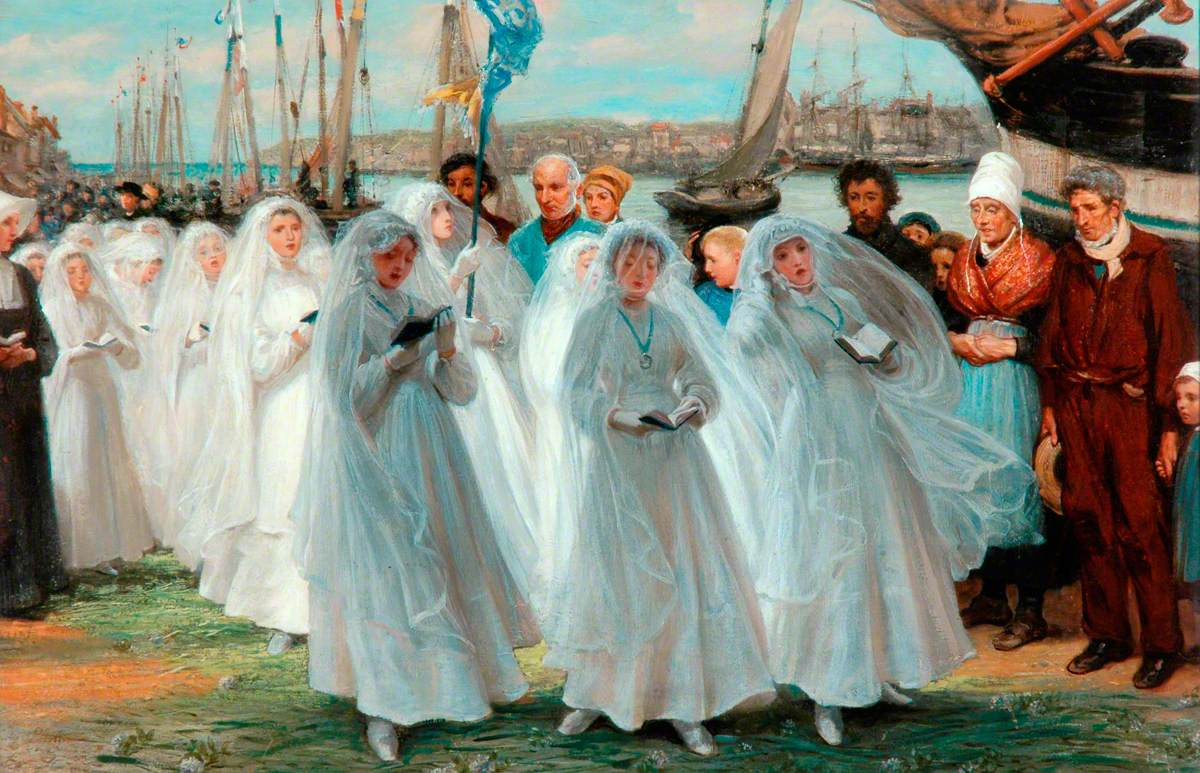
The First Communion, Dieppe by Philip Richard Morris

The Missing Boat by Erskine Nicol

Halt of Prince Charles Edward on the Banks of the Nairne by Richard Beavis

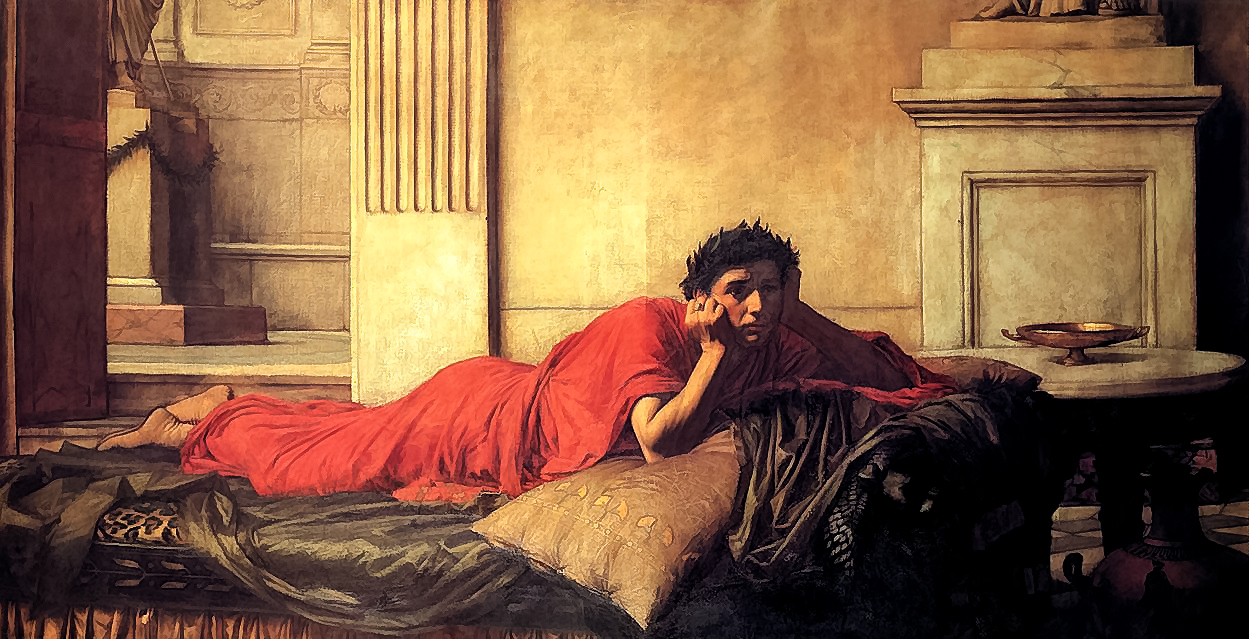
The Remorse of the Emperor Nero after the Murder of his Mother by John William Waterhouse

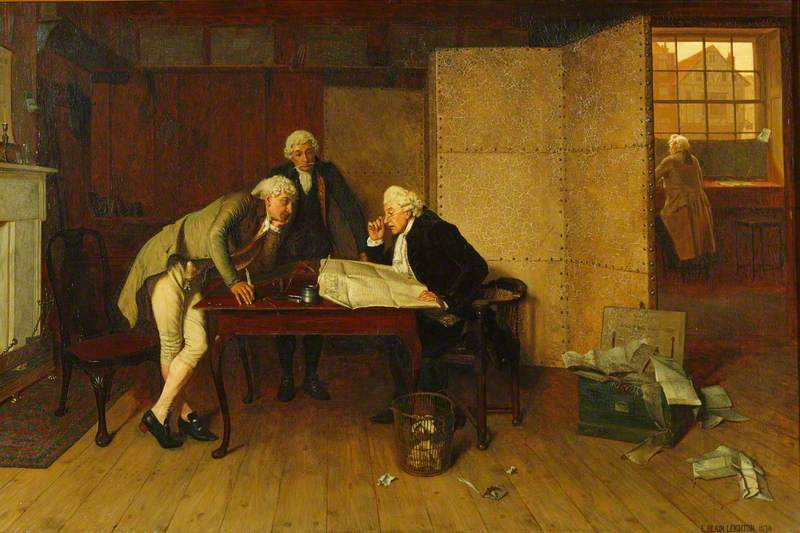
A Flaw in the Title by Edmund Leighton

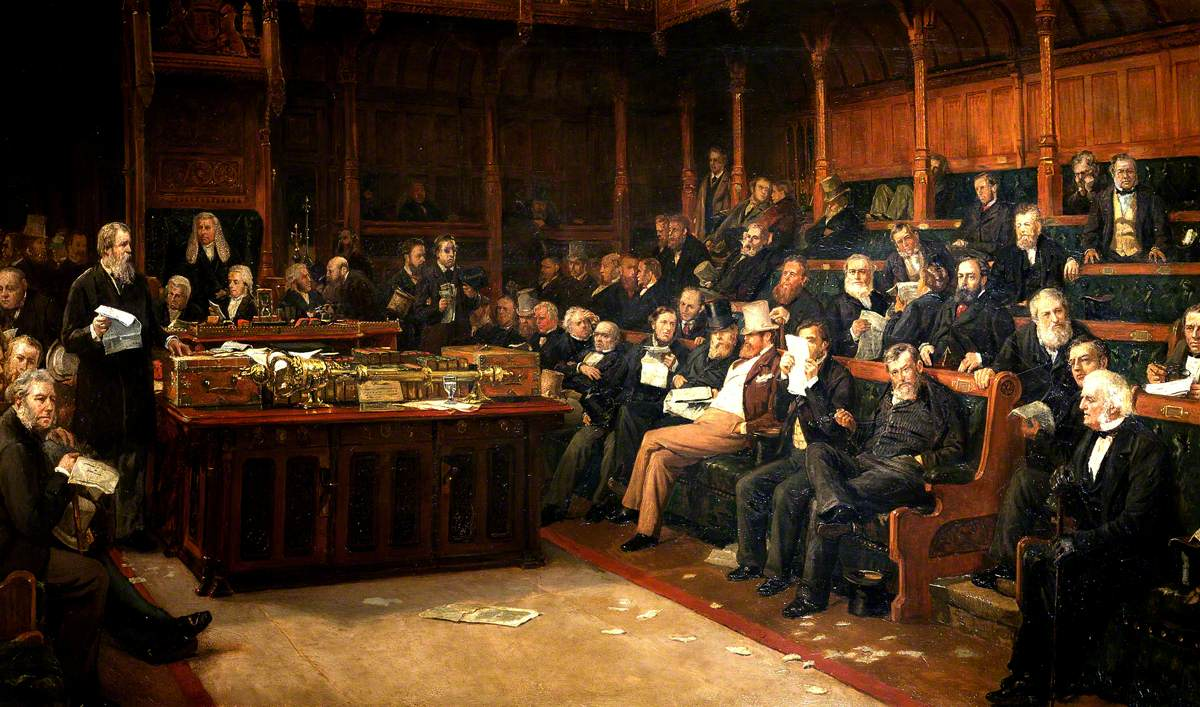
The House of Commons by William Morrison Wyllie

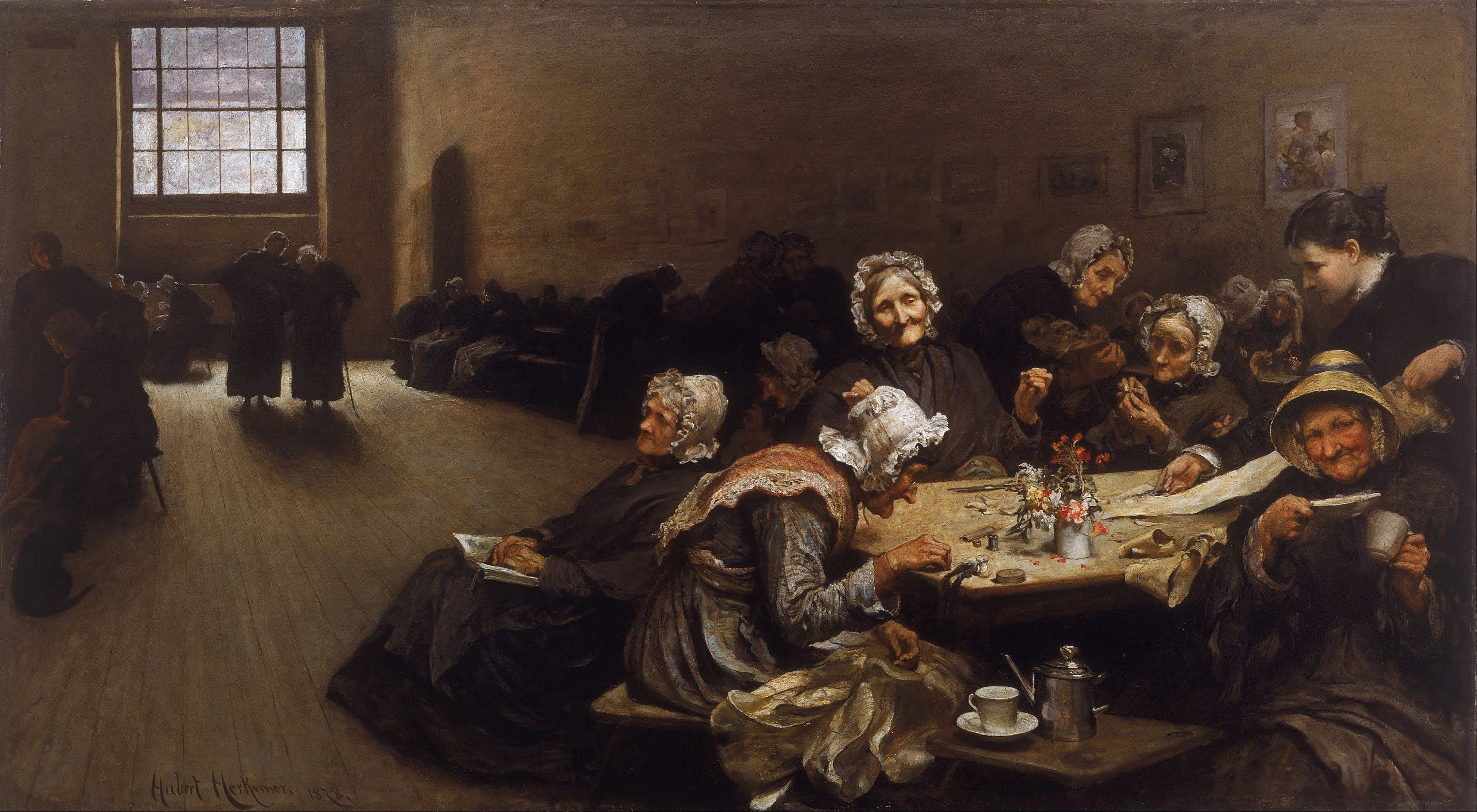
Eventide: A Scene in the Westminster Union by Hubert von Herkomer

Reaping Time by George Bernard O'Neill

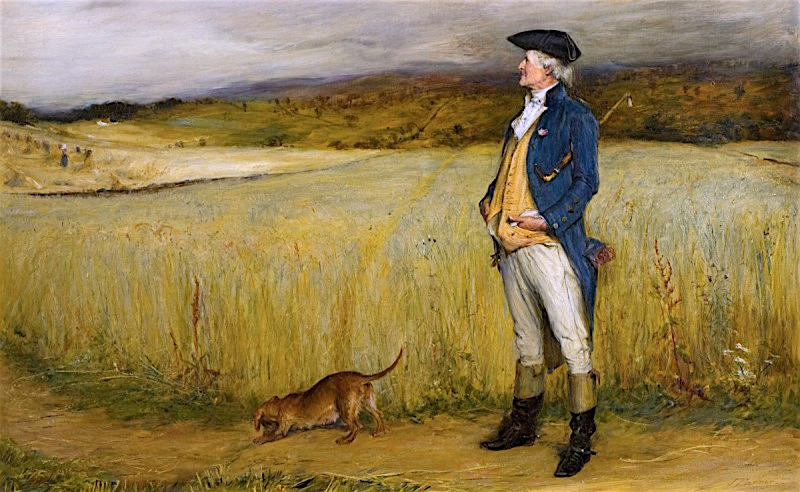
The Laird by John Pettie

The Raid of Ruthven by William Baxter Collier Fyfe

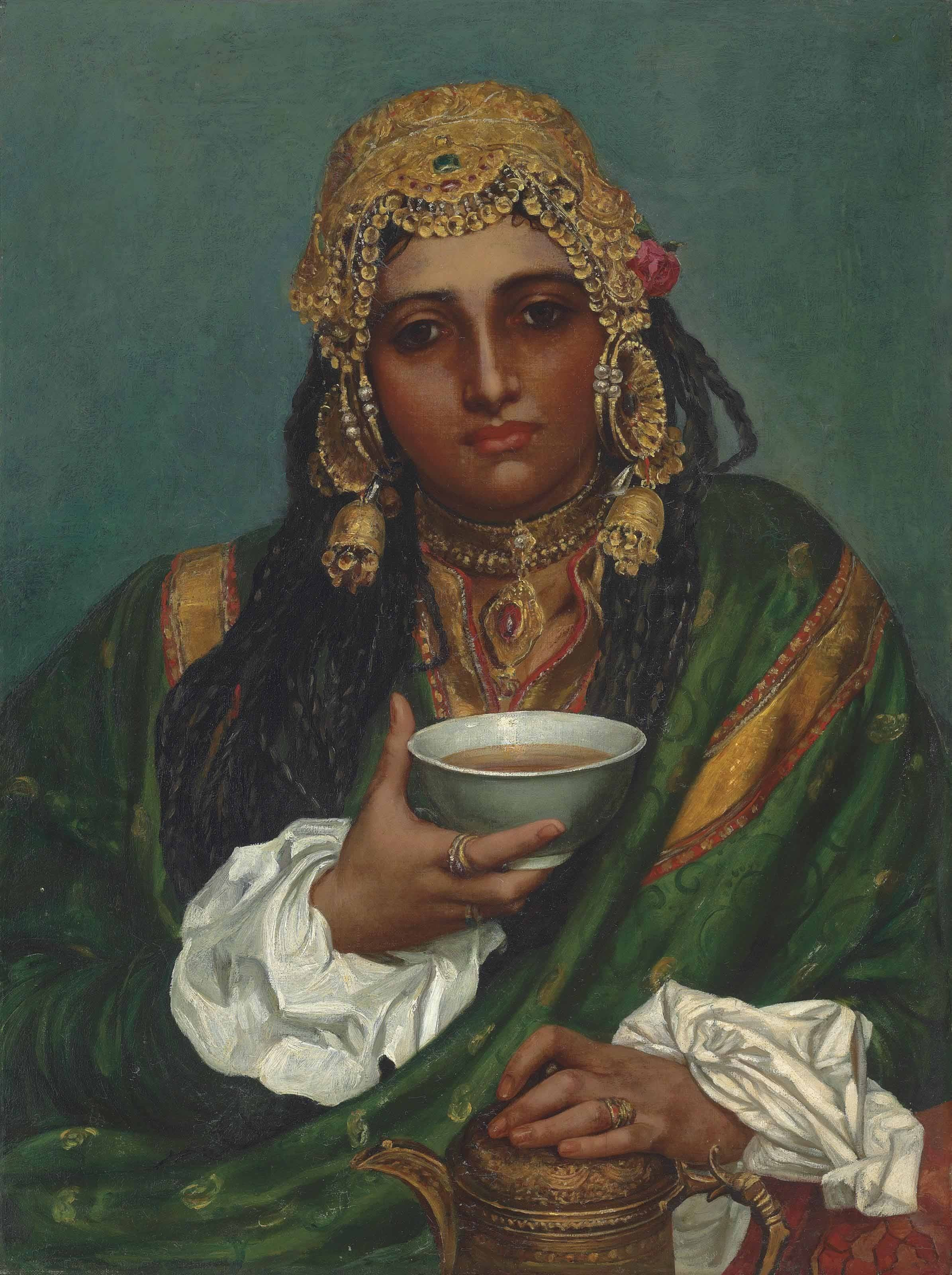
Martaba, a Kashmiree Nautch girl by Valentine Cameron Prinsep

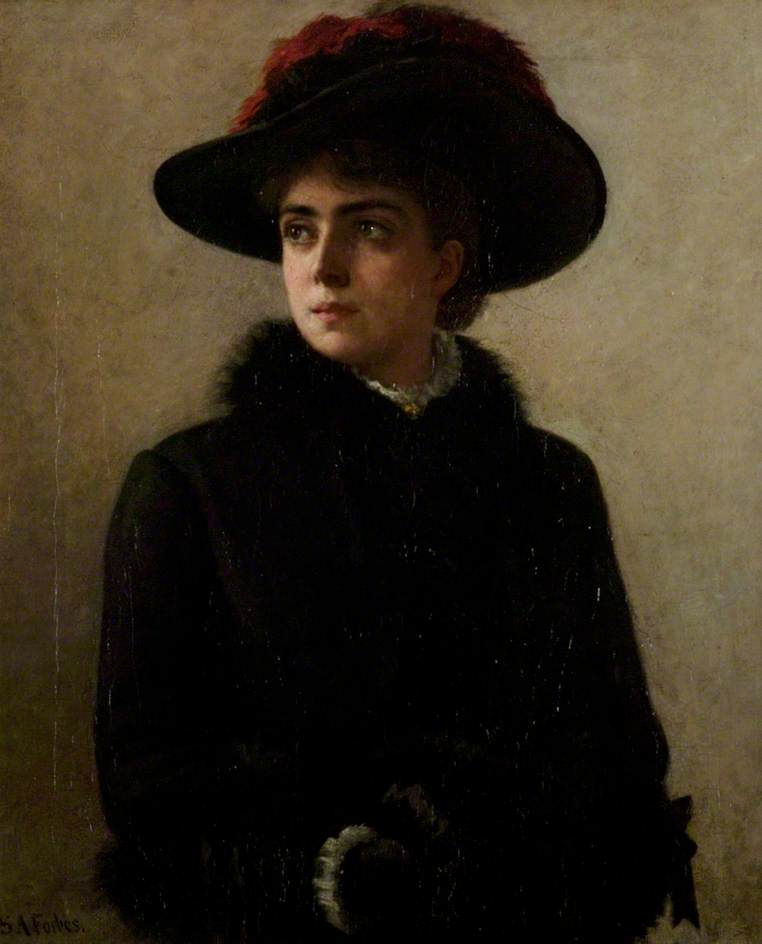
Florence by Stanhope Forbes

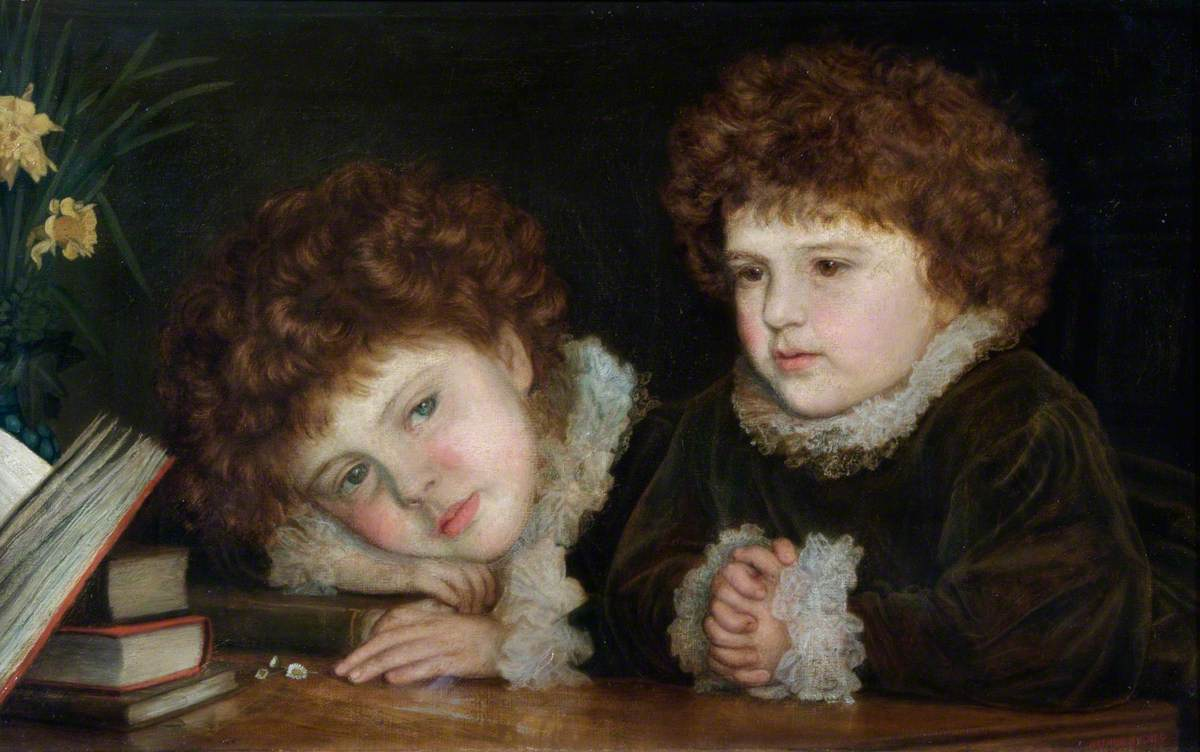
Mabel and Ruth Orrinsmith by Arthur Hughes

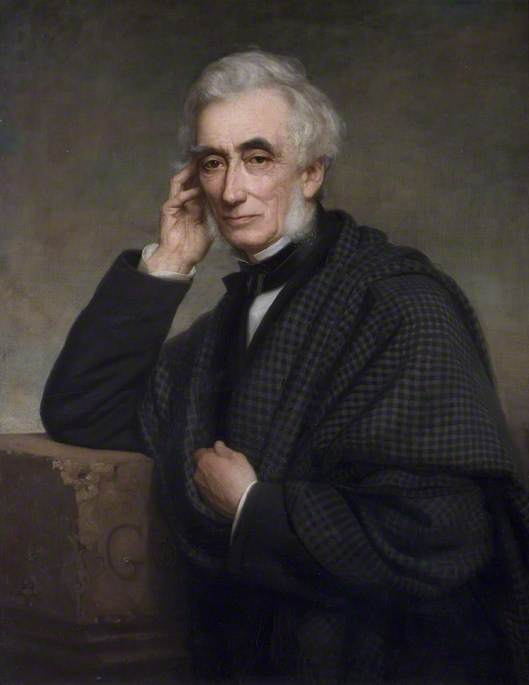
John Collingwood Bruce by Rudolf Lehmann

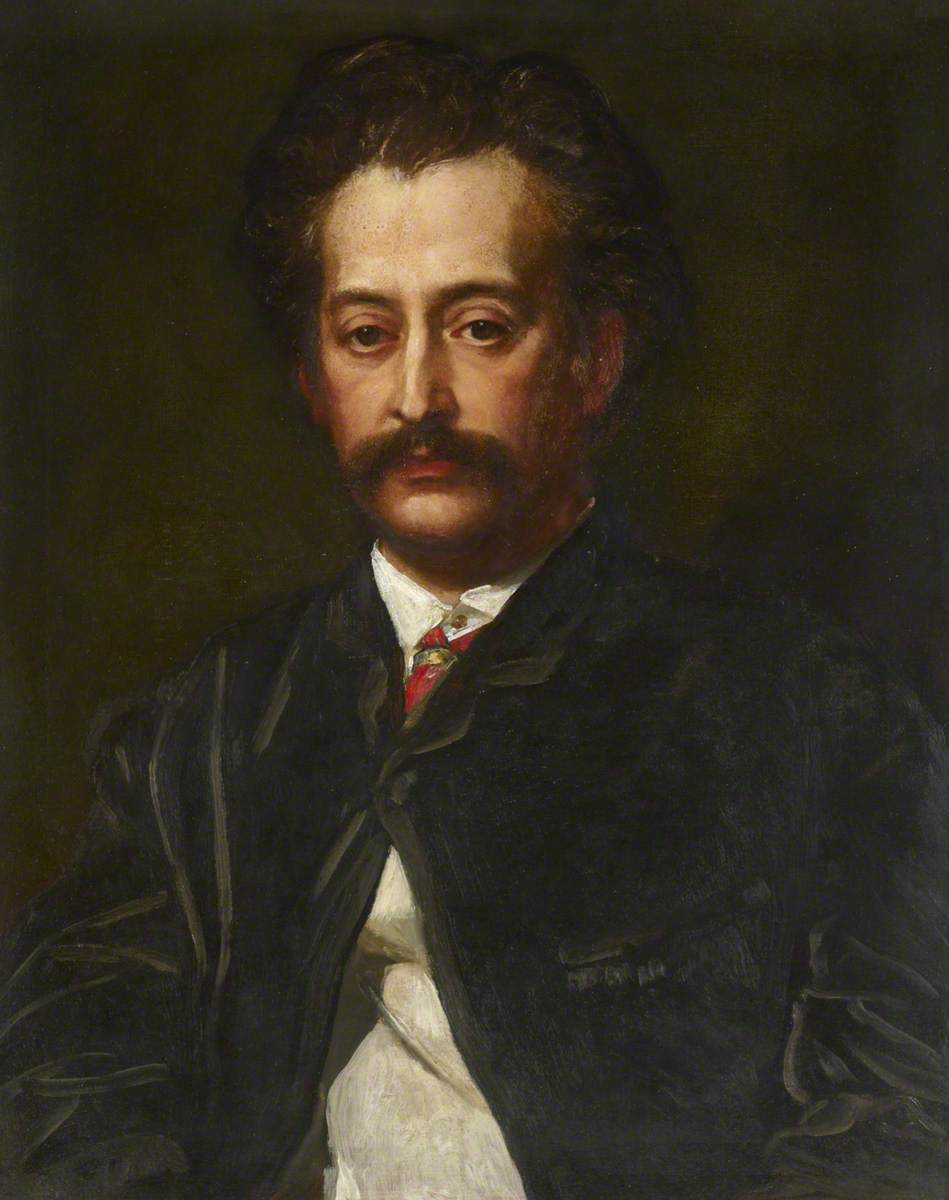
Jacques Blumenthal by George Frederic Watts

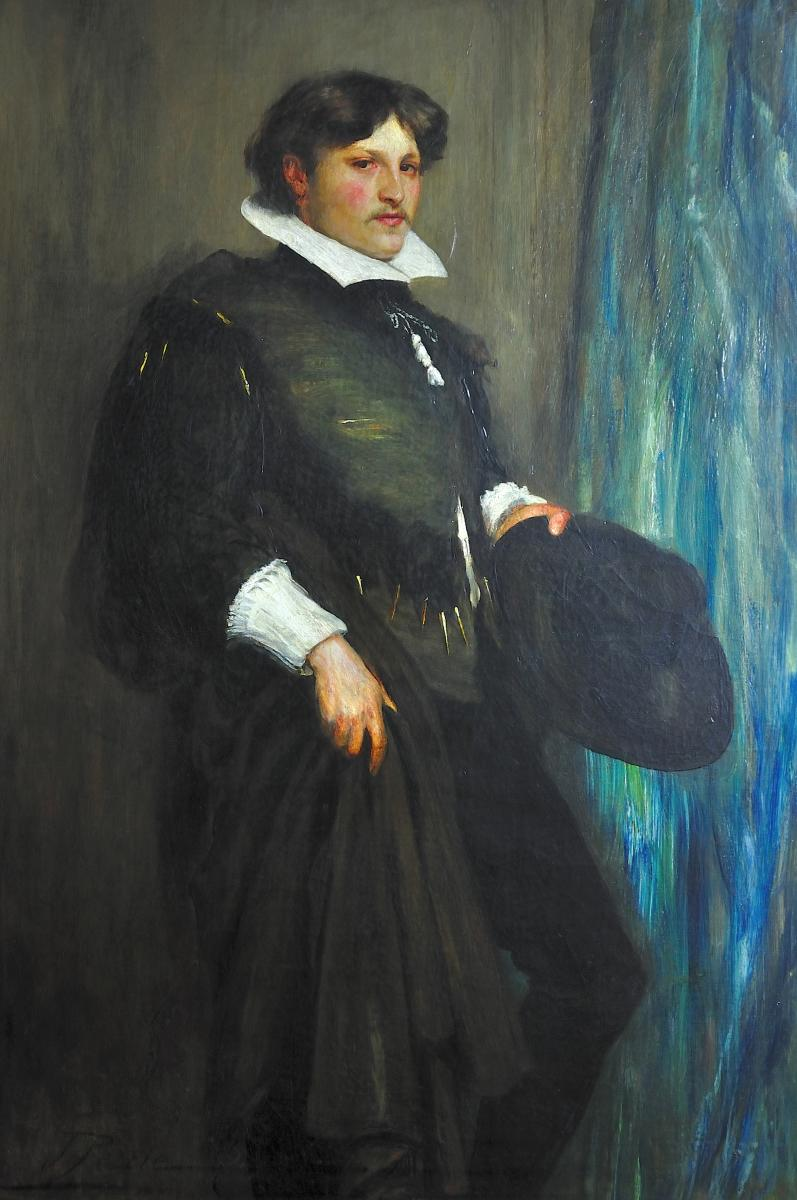
Smith Taylor Whitehead by John Pettie

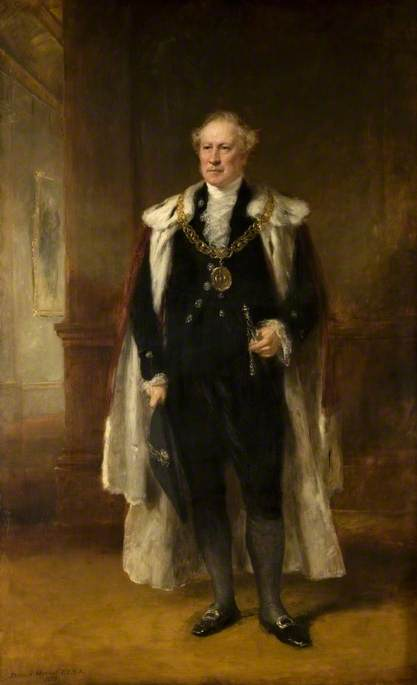
James Bain by Daniel Macnee

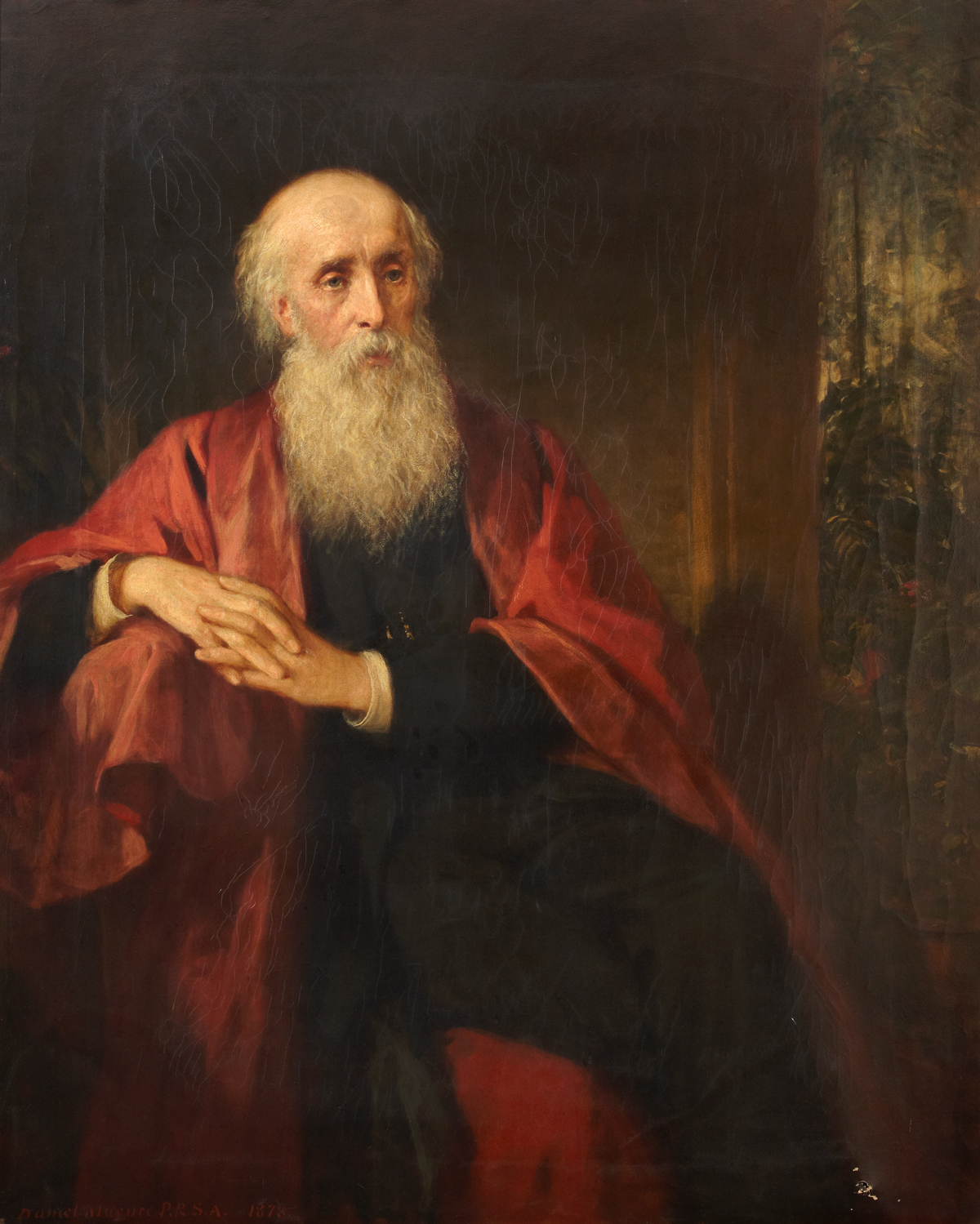
John Hutton Balfour by Daniel Macnee

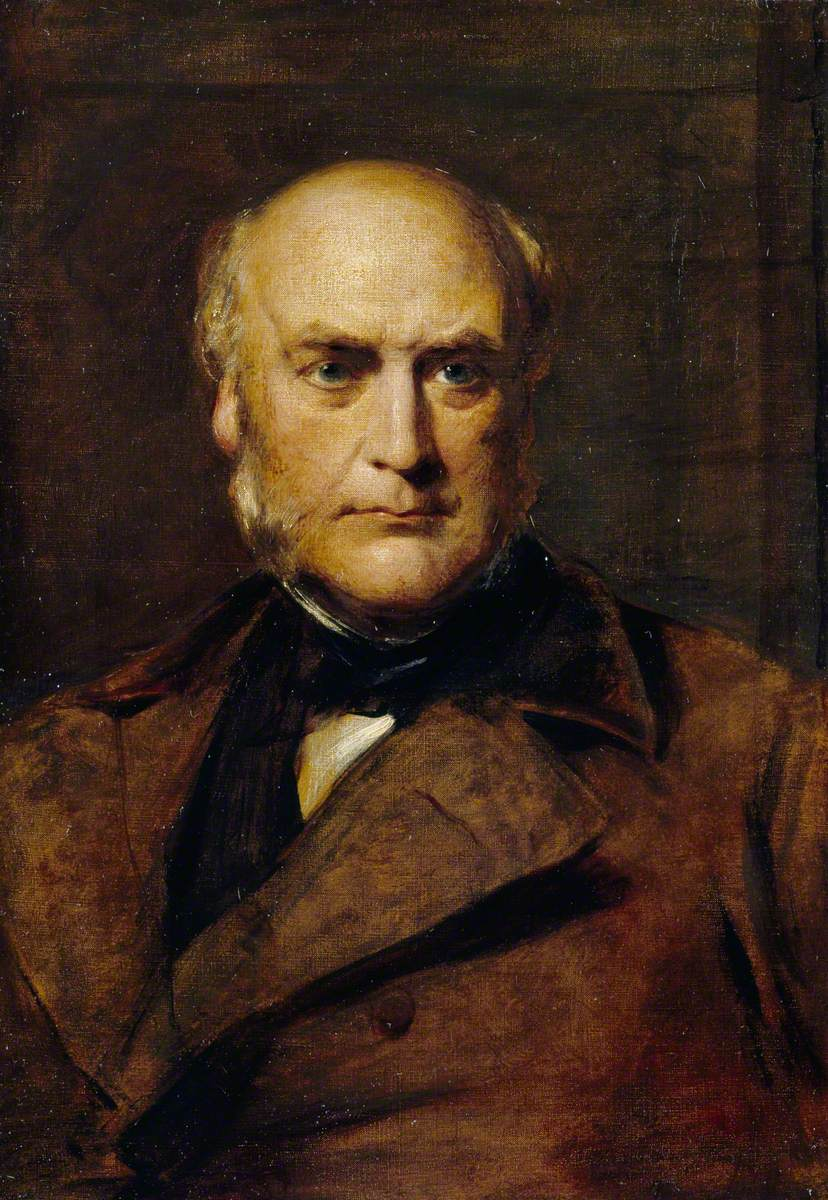
George Gilbert Scott by George Richmond

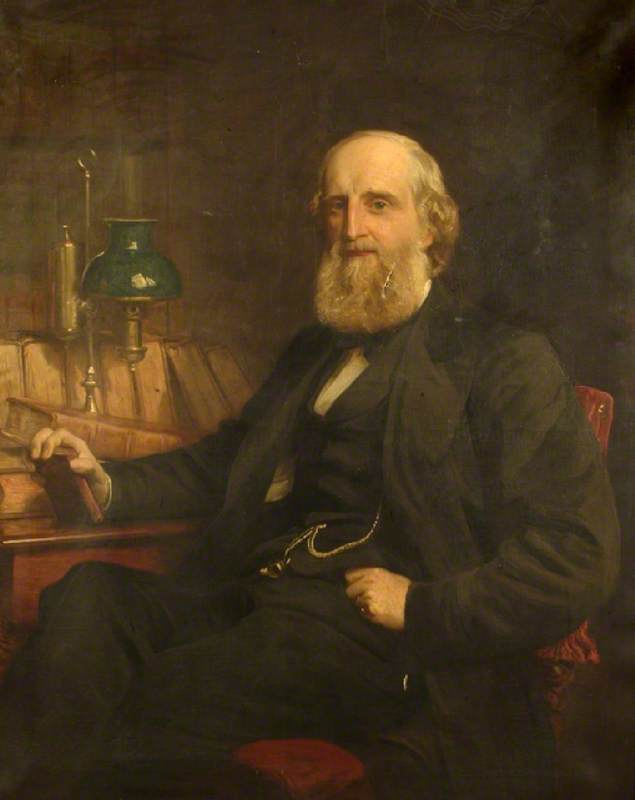
William Shaen by Henry Tanworth Wells

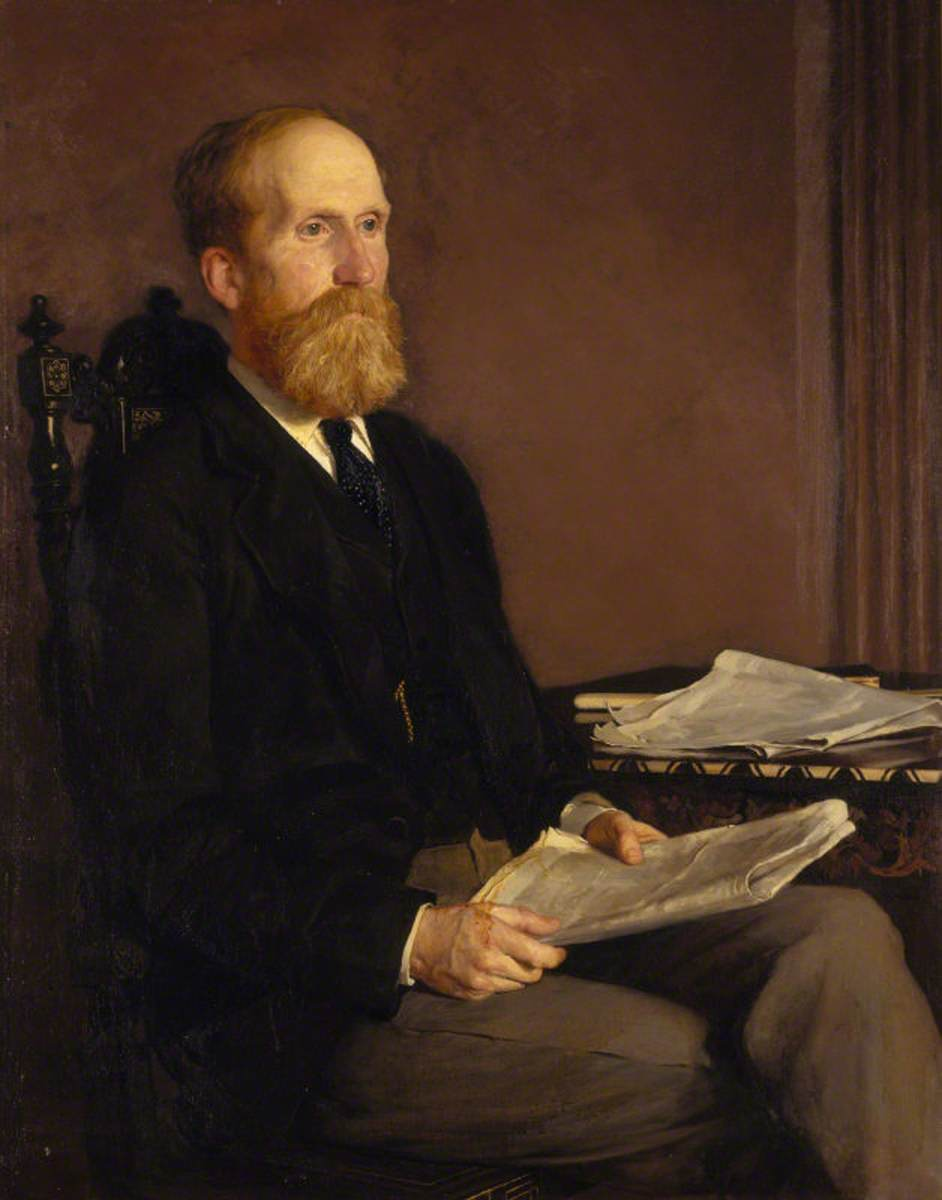
George Fownes-Luttrell by Cyrus Johnson

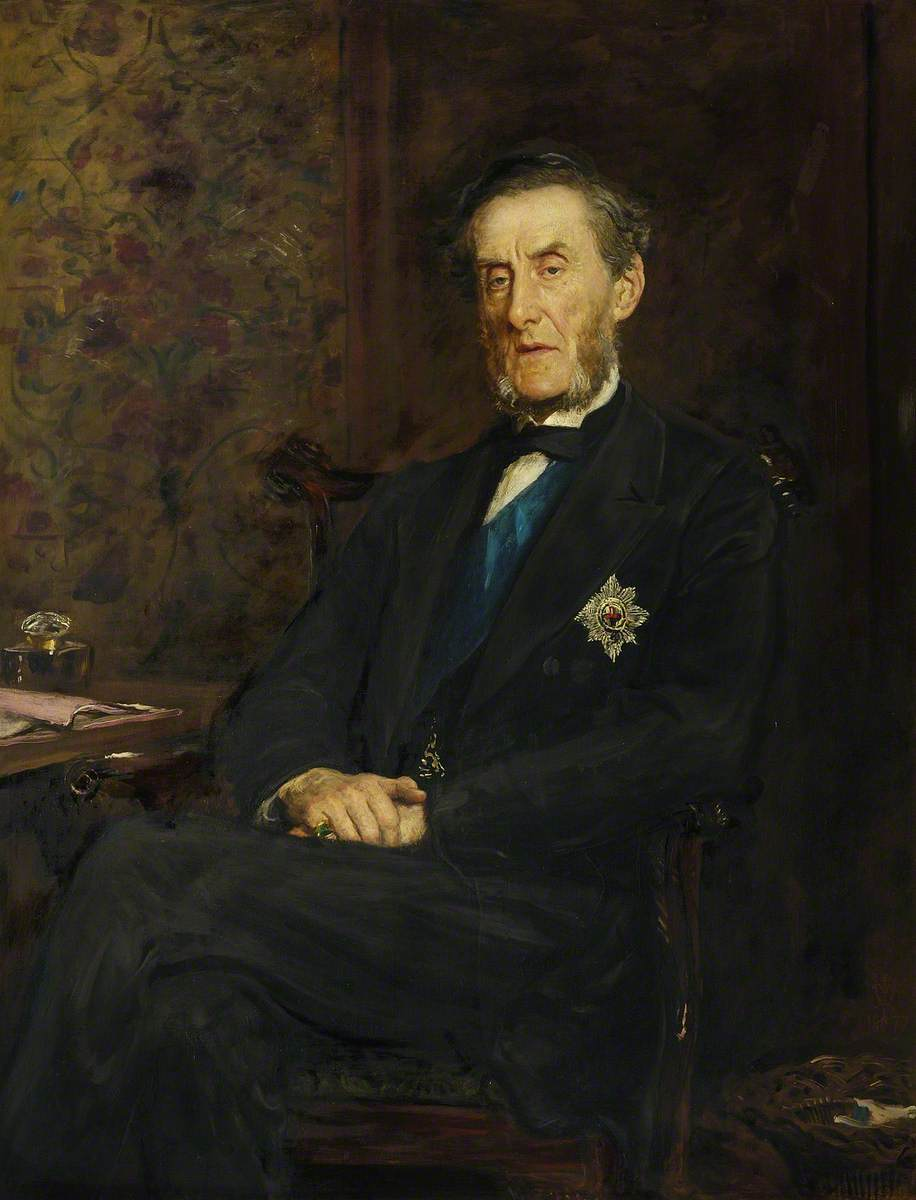
Earl of Shaftesbury by John Everett Millais

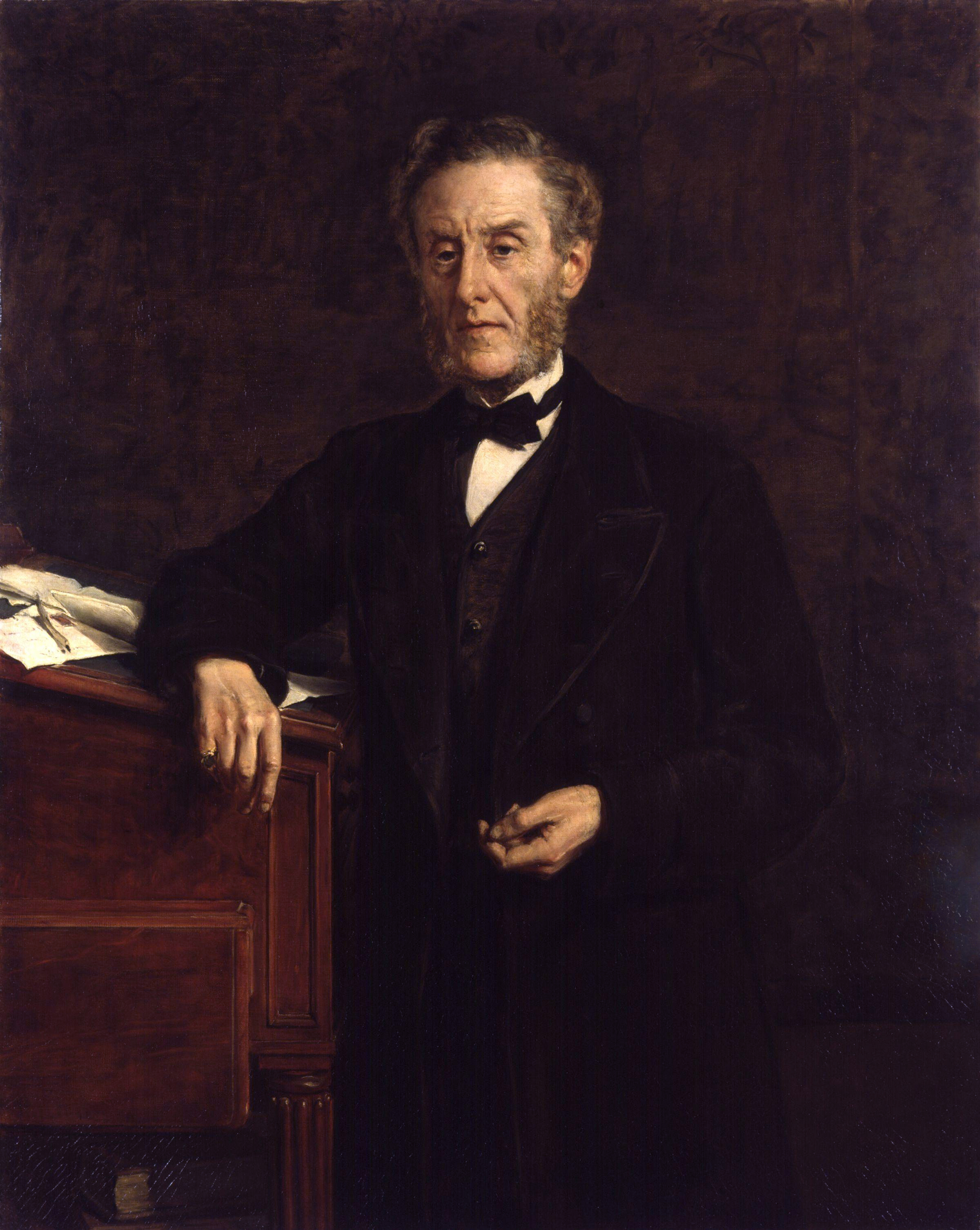
Earl of Shaftesbury by John Collier

Henry Irving as Richard, Duke of Gloucester by Edwin Long

== Bibliography ==
- Aruz, Joan (ed.) Palmyra: Mirage in the Desert. Metropolitan Museum of Art, 2018.
- Bills, Mark & Knight, Vivien (ed.) William Powell Frith: Painting the Victorian Age. Yale University Press, 2006
- Green, Richard & Sellars, Jane. William Powell Frith: The People's Painter. Bloomsbury, 2019.
- Herdrich, Stephanie L., Yount, Sylvia, Immerwahr, Daniel, Riopelle, Christopher & Shaw, Gwendolyn DuBois. Winslow Homer: Crosscurrents. Metropolitan Museum of Art, 2022.
