= Stilt house =

Houses raised on piles over the surface of the soil or a body of water

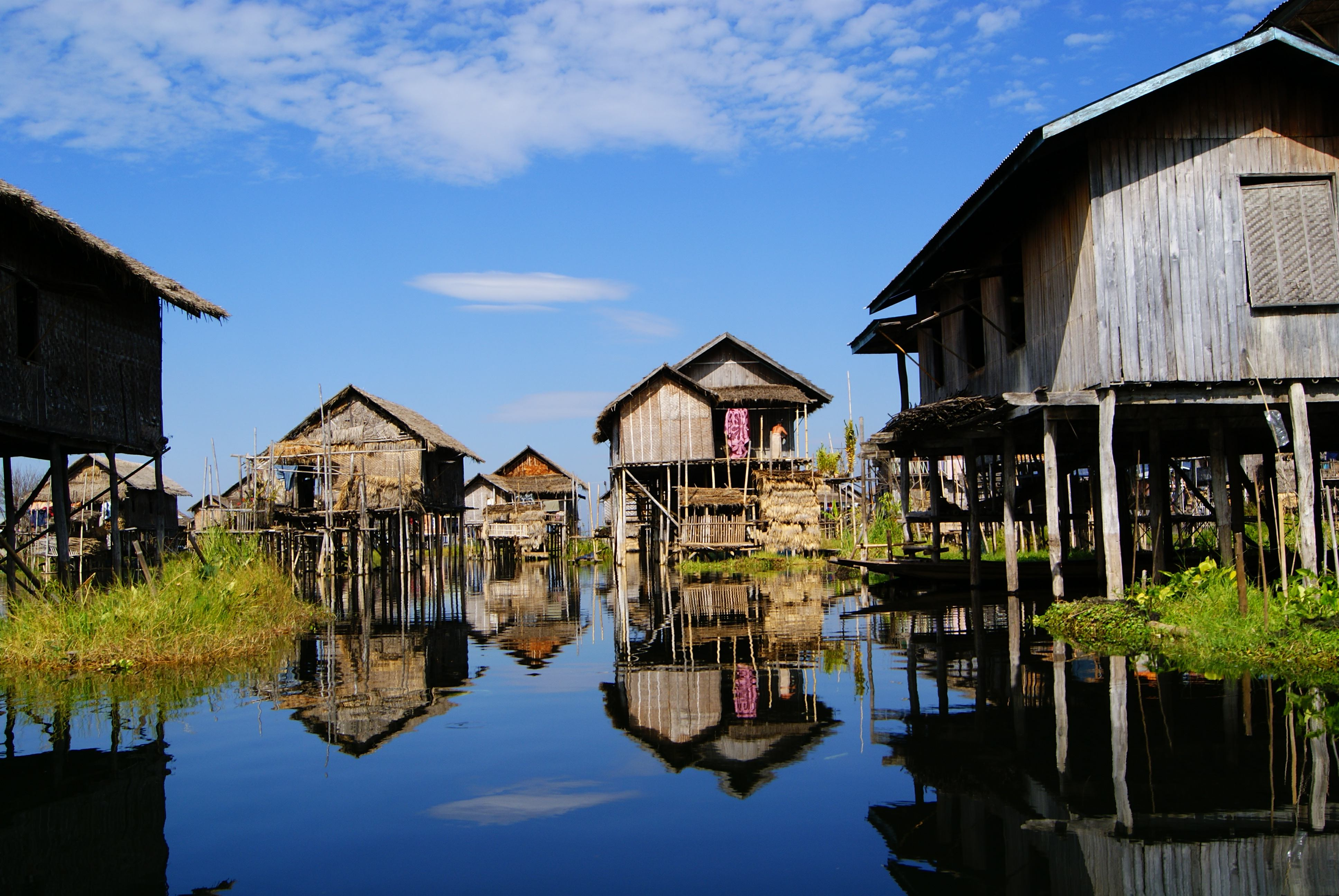
Nyaungshwe Township in the Inle Lake, Myanmar

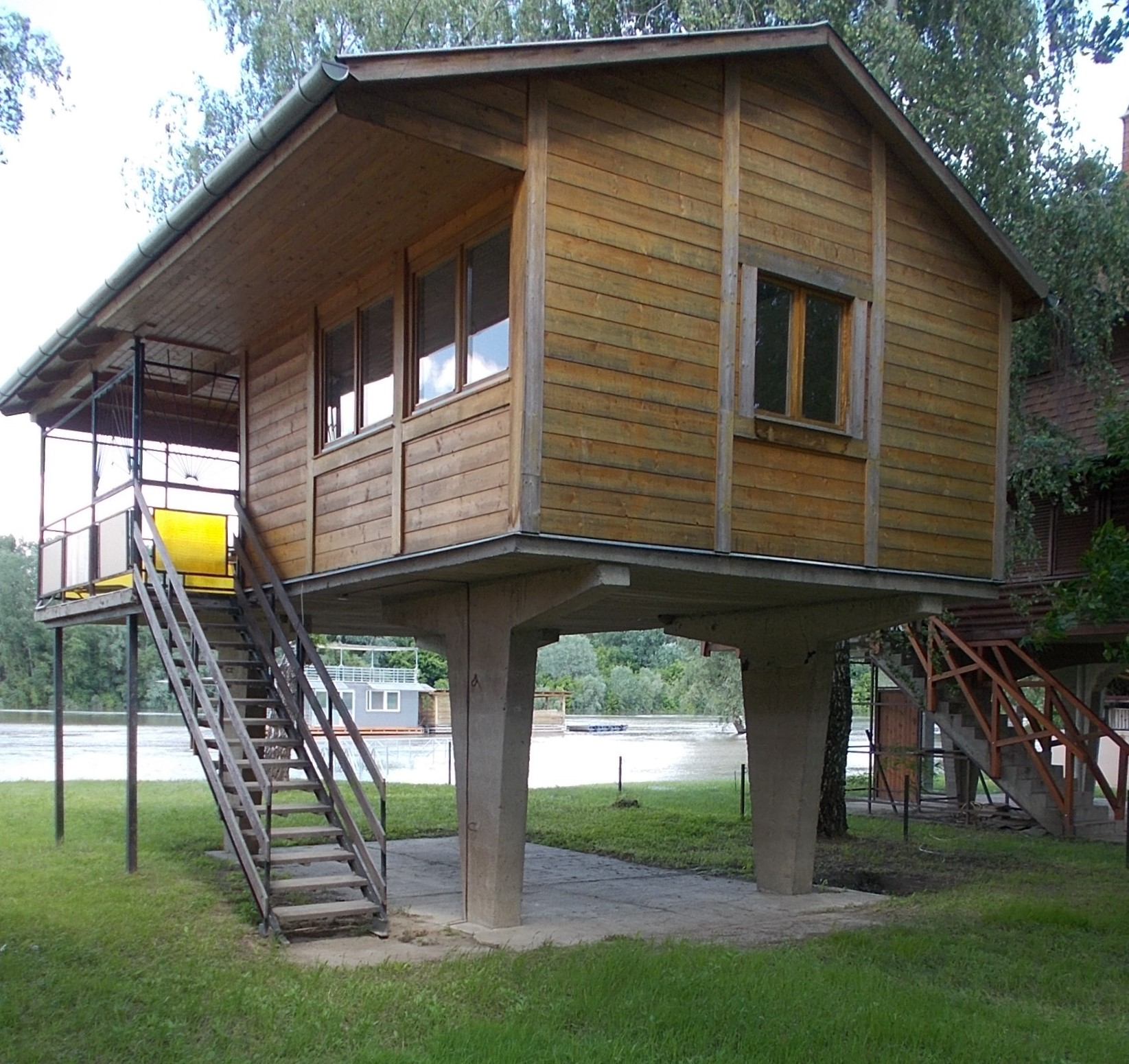
Modern stilt houses along the Tisza River with concrete foundation and stilts, Csongrád, Hungary

A stilt apartment in Reading, Berkshire, United Kingdom

Stilt houses (also known as pile or lake dwellings) are freestanding residential buildings (houses) whose main structure is held elevated above the ground or water body like a pier by thin pillars known as stilts. They are primarily built to protect against flooding; and to keep out vermin on the ground. The shaded area beneath the house, when the ground is not inundated, is often used as an undercroft for work, storage or parking. Such dwellings are common across coastal/riparian zones of Southeast Asia, Oceania, Central America, the Caribbean, parts of coastal West Africa, northern parts of South America, the Comoros, Madagascar, Mauritius, Seychelles, Sri Lanka, and the Maldives.

Stilt apartments are low-rise apartment buildings that are built on the same off-the-ground concept as stilt houses, although the undercroft area is typically designed to provide covered residential parking spaces for the tenants rather than for flood protection.

== Types ==
- Diaojiaolou – Stilt houses in southern China.
- Heliotrope – A concept house designed by Rolf Disch with a single stilt, optimized for harnessing solar power.
- Kelong – Built primarily for fishing, but often doubling up as offshore dwellings in the following countries: Philippines, Malaysia, Indonesia and Singapore.
- Bahay Kubo – The traditional house type prevalent in the Philippines.
- Palafito – Found throughout South America since Pre-Columbian times. In the late 19th century, numerous palafitos were built in Chilean cities such as Castro, Chonchi, and other towns in the Chiloé Archipelago, and are now considered a typical element of Chilotan architecture.
- Pang uk – A special kind of house found in Tai O, Lantau, Hong Kong, mainly built by Tankas.
- Papua New Guinea stilt house – A kind of stilt house constructed by Motuans, commonly found in the southern coastal area of PNG.
- Queenslander – Stilt house common in Queensland and northern New South Wales, Australia.
- Chaang Ghar – A type of stilt house built in Assam state of India. It is mainly found in flood-prone areas of the Brahmaputra River valley.
- Thai stilt house – A kind of house often built on freshwater, e.g., a lotus pond.
- Vietnamese stilt house – Similar to the Thai ones, except having a front door with a smaller height for religious reasons.

== Africa ==
Stilted granaries are also a common feature in West Africa, e.g., in the Malinke language regions of Mali and Guinea.

== Americas ==
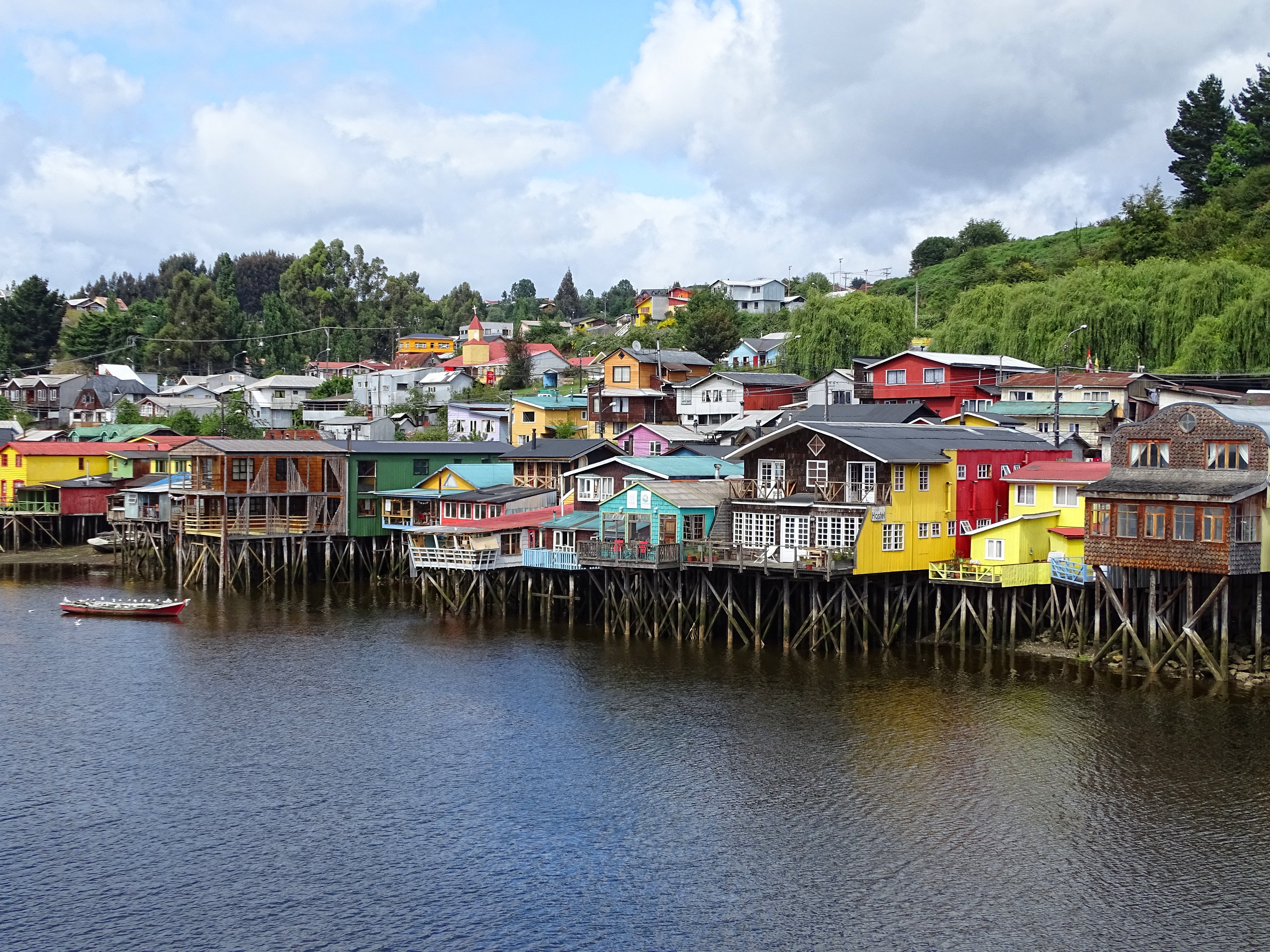
Palafitos in Castro, Chiloé Archipelago, Chile

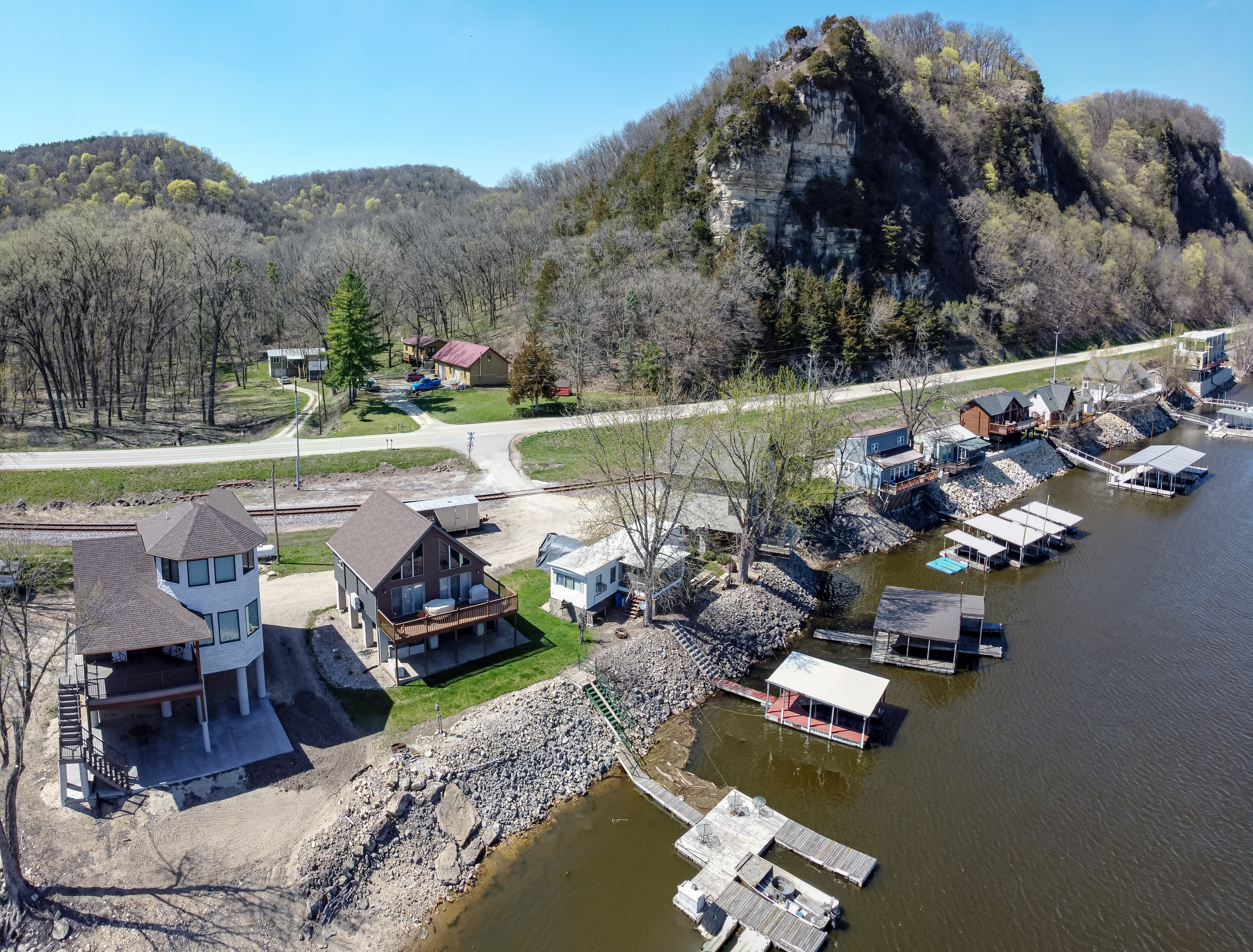
Stilt houses on the banks of the Mississippi in Iowa

Stilt houses were also built by Amerindians in pre-Columbian times. Palafitos are especially widespread along the banks of the tropical river valleys of South America, notably the Amazon and Orinoco river systems. Stilt houses were such a prevalent feature along the shores of Lake Maracaibo that Amerigo Vespucci was inspired to name the region "Venezuela" (little Venice). As the costs of hurricane damage increase, more and more houses along the Gulf Coast are being built as or converted to stilt houses.

Stilt houses are still commonplace in parts of the Mosquito Coast in northeastern Nicaragua, and in northern Brazil. They are also common in the bayou parts of the Southern United States, the hurricane prone Florida Keys, and the South Carolina Lowcountry.

== Arctic ==
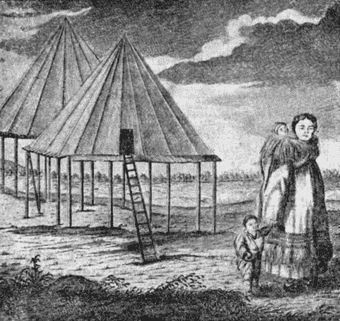
Summer family dwellings of the natives of the Kamchatka Peninsula (Russia) called Itelmens or Kamchadals. Their winter dwellings were earth-sheltered and communal.

Houses where permafrost is present, in the Arctic, are built on stilts to keep permafrost under them from melting. Permafrost can be up to 70% water. While frozen, it provides a stable foundation. However, if heat radiating from the bottom of a home melts the permafrost, the home goes out of level and starts sinking into the ground. Other means of keeping the permafrost from melting are available, but raising the home off the ground on stilts is one of the most effective ways.

== Asia-Pacific ==
=== Austronesia ===
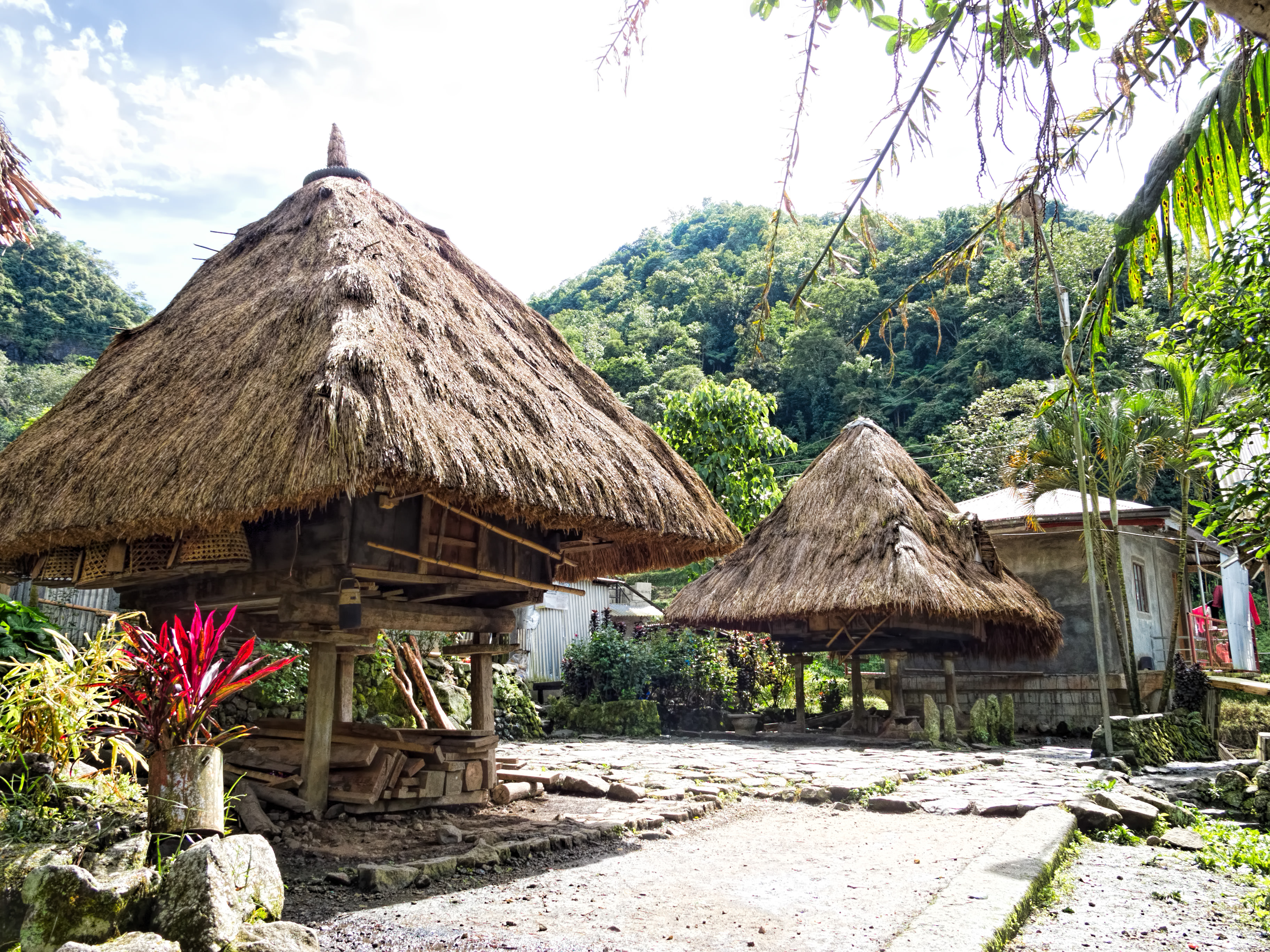
The raised bale houses of the Ifugao people with capped house posts are believed to be derived from the designs of traditional granaries

Raised rectangular houses are one of the cultural hallmarks of the Austronesian peoples and are found throughout the regions in Maritime Southeast Asia, Island Melanesia, Micronesia, and Polynesia settled by Austronesians. The structures are raised on piles, usually with the space underneath also utilized for storage or domestic animals. The raised design had multiple advantages, they mitigate damage during flooding and (in very tall examples) can act as defensive structures during conflicts. The house posts are also distinctively capped with larger-diameter discs at the top, to prevent vermin and pests from entering the structures by climbing them. Austronesian houses and other structures are usually built in wetlands and alongside bodies of water, but can also be built in the highlands or even directly on shallow water.

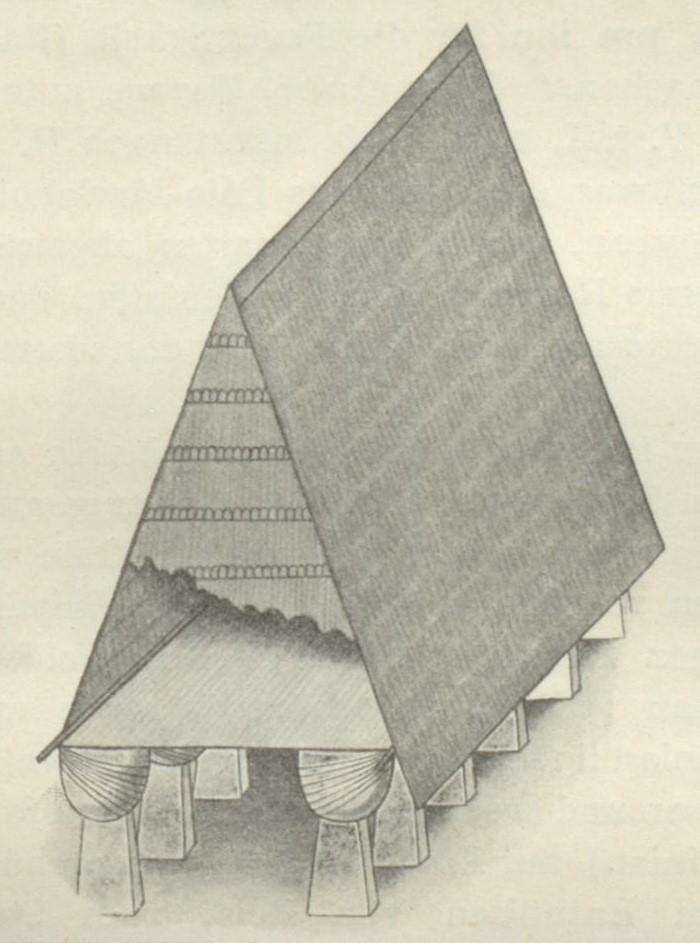
Reconstruction of Latte period Chamorro buildings raised on capped stone pillars called haligi

Building structures on pilings is believed to be derived from the design of raised rice granaries and storehouses, which are highly important status symbols among the ancestrally rice-cultivating Austronesians. The rice granary shrine was also the archetypal religious building among Austronesian cultures and was used to store carvings of ancestor spirits and local deities. While rice cultivation wasn't among the technologies carried into Remote Oceania, raised storehouses still survived. The pātaka of the Māori people is such an example. The largest pātaka are elaborately adorned with carvings and are often the tallest buildings in the Māori pā. They were used to store implements, weapons, ships, and other valuables; while smaller pātaka were used to store provisions. A special type of pātaka supported by a single tall post also had ritual importance and were used to isolate high-born children during their training for leadership.

The majority of Austronesian structures are not permanent. They are made from perishable materials like wood, bamboo, plant fiber, and leaves. Because of this, archaeological records of prehistoric Austronesian structures are usually limited to traces of house posts, with no way of determining the original building plans. Indirect evidence of traditional Austronesian architecture, however, can be gleaned from their contemporary representations in art, like in friezes on the walls of later Hindu-Buddhist stone temples (like in reliefs in Borobudur and Prambanan). But these are limited to the recent centuries. They can also be reconstructed linguistically from shared terms for architectural elements, like ridge-poles, thatch, rafters, house posts, hearth, notched log ladders, storage racks, public buildings, and so on. Linguistic evidence also makes it clear that stilt houses were already present among Austronesian groups since at least the Late Neolithic.

In the late 20th century, stilt houses in extremely calm ocean water became a popular form of tourist lodging known as overwater bungalows; the trend began in French Polynesia and quickly spread to other tourist locations, especially in tropical locales.

=== East Asia and Mainland Southeast Asia ===
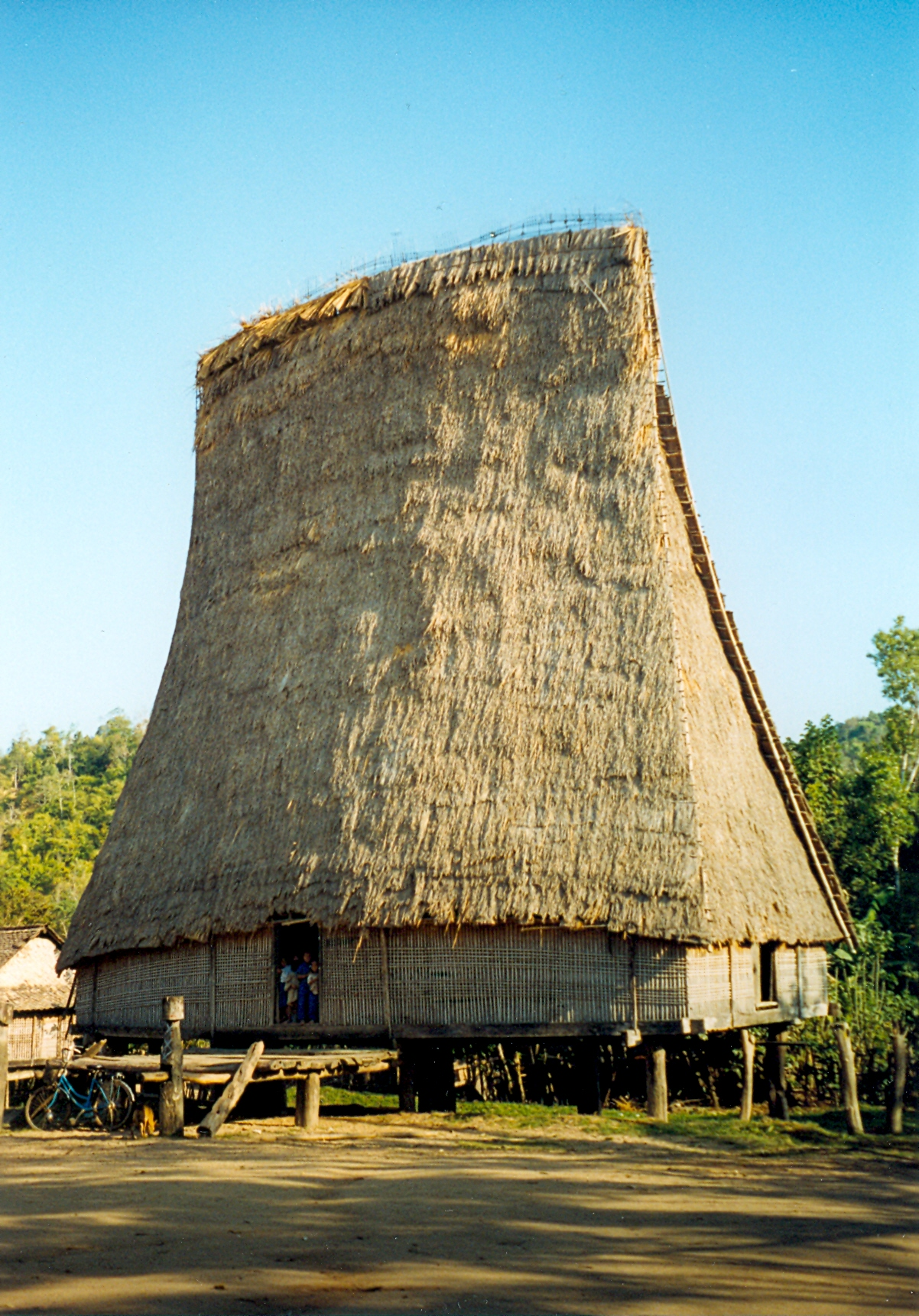
A stilt house of the Bahnar people, an Austroasiatic-speaking ethnic group.

Arbi et al. (2013) have also noted the striking similarities between Austronesian architecture and Japanese traditional raised architecture (shinmei-zukuri). Particularly the buildings of the Ise Grand Shrine, which contrast with the pit-houses typical of the Neolithic Yayoi period. They propose significant Neolithic contact between the people of southern Japan and Austronesians or pre-Austronesians that occurred prior to the spread of Han Chinese cultural influence to the islands. Rice cultivation is also believed to have been introduced to Japan from a para-Austronesian group from coastal eastern China. Waterson (2009) has also argued that the architectural tradition of stilt houses in eastern Asia and the Pacific is originally Austronesian, and that similar building traditions in Japan and mainland Asia (notably among Kra-Dai and Austroasiatic-speaking groups) correspond to contacts with a prehistoric Austronesian network.

=== South Asia ===
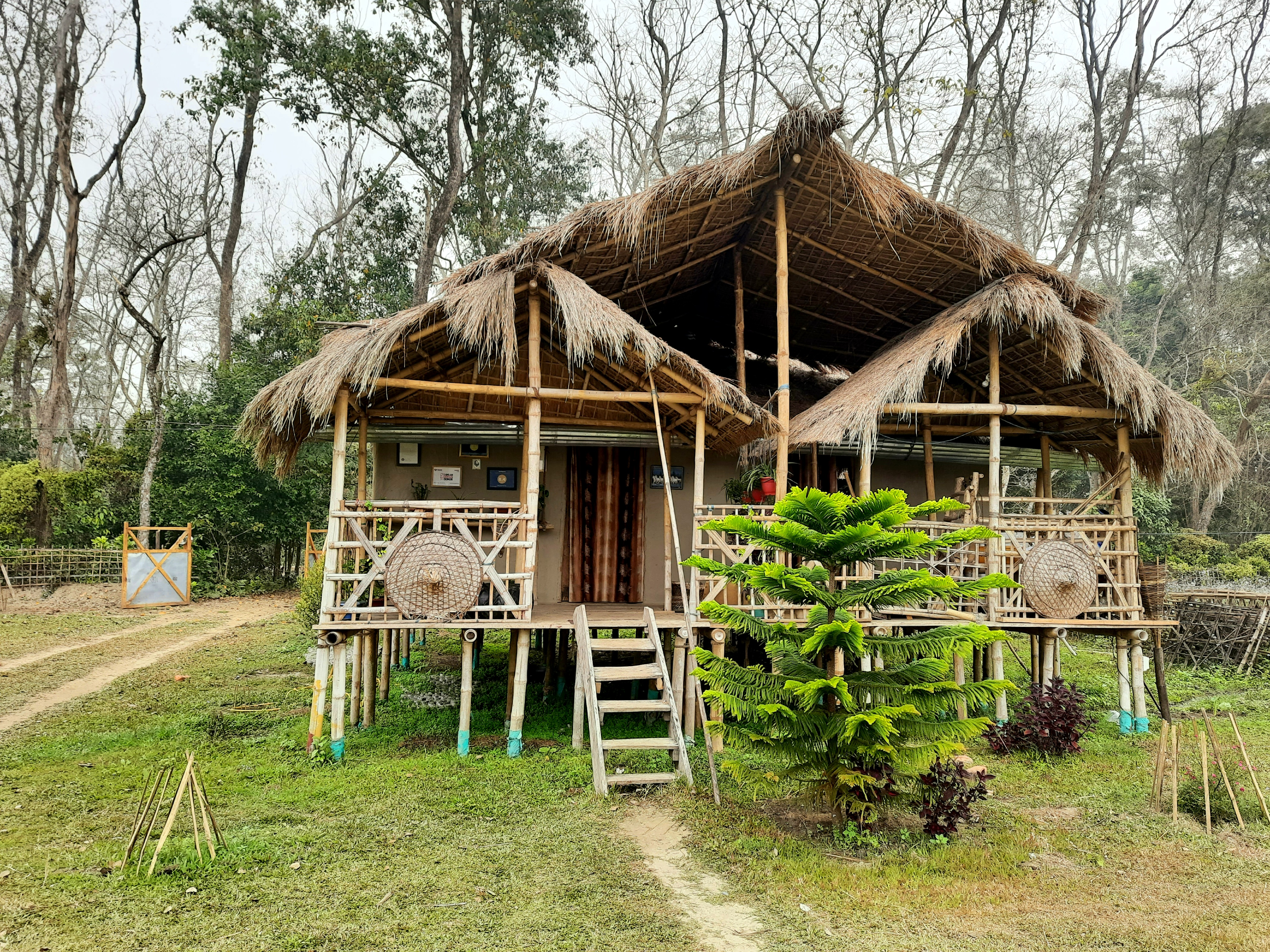
Traditional Mising houses, Majuli

In South Asia, stilt houses are very common in Northeast India, specifically the Brahmaputra Valley regions of Assam, which is extremely prone to regional flooding from the Brahmaputra. These houses are known as chang ghar in Assamese, and as kare okum in Mising; chang ghar are traditionally built by the Mising people, who live along the Brahmaputra. Unlike many forms of traditional architecture, including stilt architecture, in South and Southeast Asia, the construction of chang ghar is making a resurgence and increasing in popularity, as a result of climate change increasing regular flooding in Assam, and the stilts of the chang ghar is adapted to flooding in the first place. The height of the stilts of the chang ghar is determined by the height of the water during the last major flood.

Stilt houses are also popular in Kerala in the Kerala backwaters, another regions with high rainfall and regular flooding from monsoons. Although stilt houses in the Kerala Backwaters have been a traditional method of house construction for many years, following the disastrous 2018 floods in Kerala, many more stilt houses have been constructed recently and utilize concrete as well as timber for their pillars.

== Europe ==
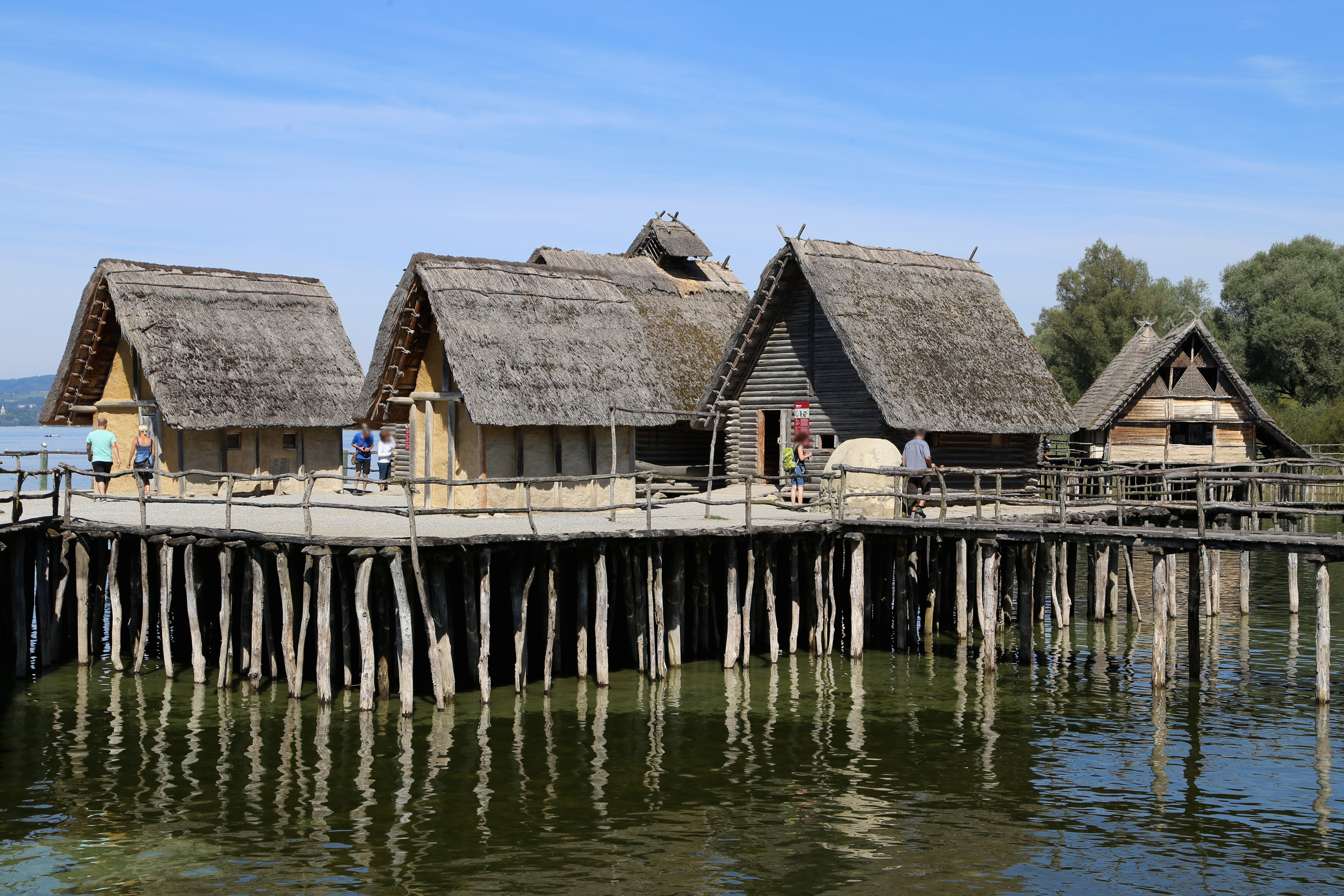
Reconstruction of Bronze Age stilt houses on Lake Constance, Pfahlbaumuseum Unteruhldingen, Germany

In Traunkirchen at Lake Traun in Upper Austria, archaeologists from the University of Innsbruck are researching the only Iron Age lakeside settlement currently known in Austria.

In the Neolithic, the Copper Age and the Bronze Age, stilt-house settlements were common in the Alpine and Pianura Padana (Terramare) regions. Remains have been found at the Ljubljana Marsh in Slovenia and at the Mondsee and Attersee lakes in Upper Austria, for example.

Early archaeologists like Ferdinand Keller thought they formed artificial islands, much like the Irish and Scottish crannogs, but today it is clear that the majority of settlements were located on the shores of lakes and were only inundated later on.

Reconstructed stilt houses are shown in open-air museums in Unteruhldingen and Zürich (Pfahlbauland). In June 2011, the prehistoric pile dwellings in six Alpine states were designated as UNESCO World Heritage Sites. A single Scandinavian pile dwelling, the Alvastra stilt houses, has been excavated in Sweden. Herodotus has described in his Histories the dwellings of the "lake-dwellers" in Paeonia and how those were constructed.

In the Alps, similar buildings, known as raccards, are still in use as granaries. In England, granaries are placed on staddle stones, similar to stilts, to prevent mice and rats getting to the grain.

In Italy there are several stilt-houses settlements, for example the one on the Rocca di Manerba del Garda.

In Scotland there used to be prehistoric stilt houses called crannogs.

== Tourism ==
Stilt houses as water villas are common in the Maldives and Assam.

== Gallery ==
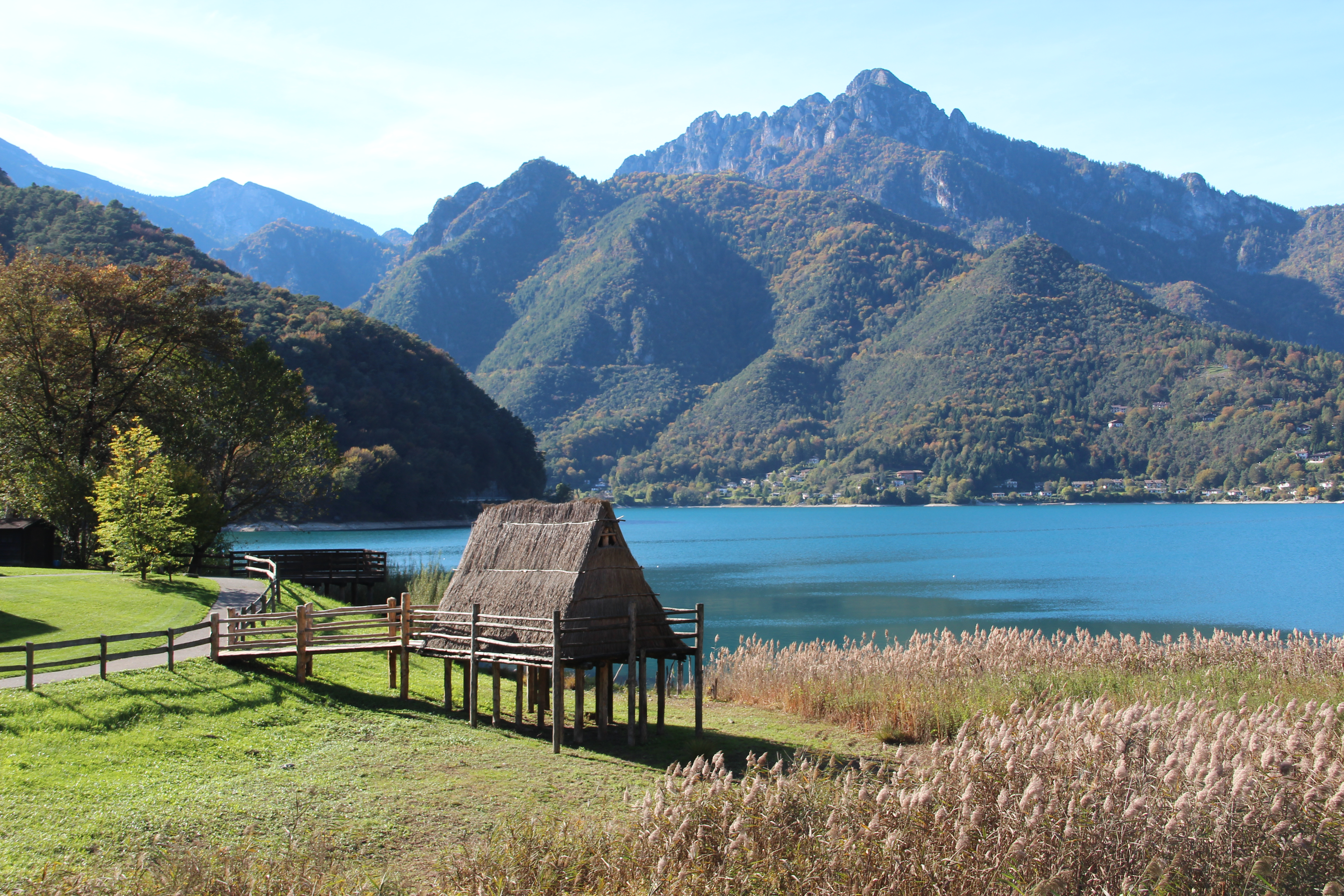
Palafittes of Ledro, Italy

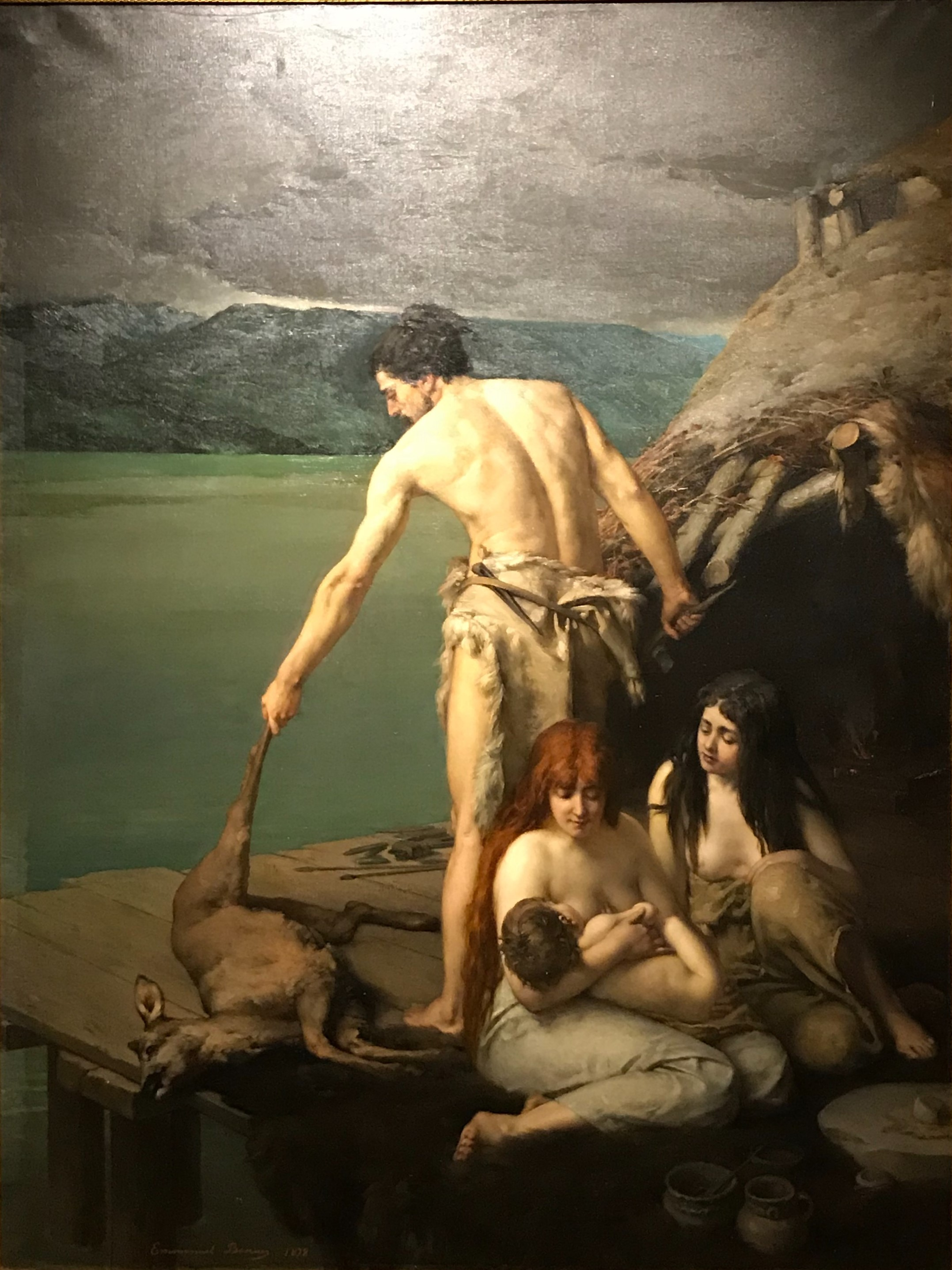
Lakeside Dwelling (1878 painting by Emmanuel Benner)

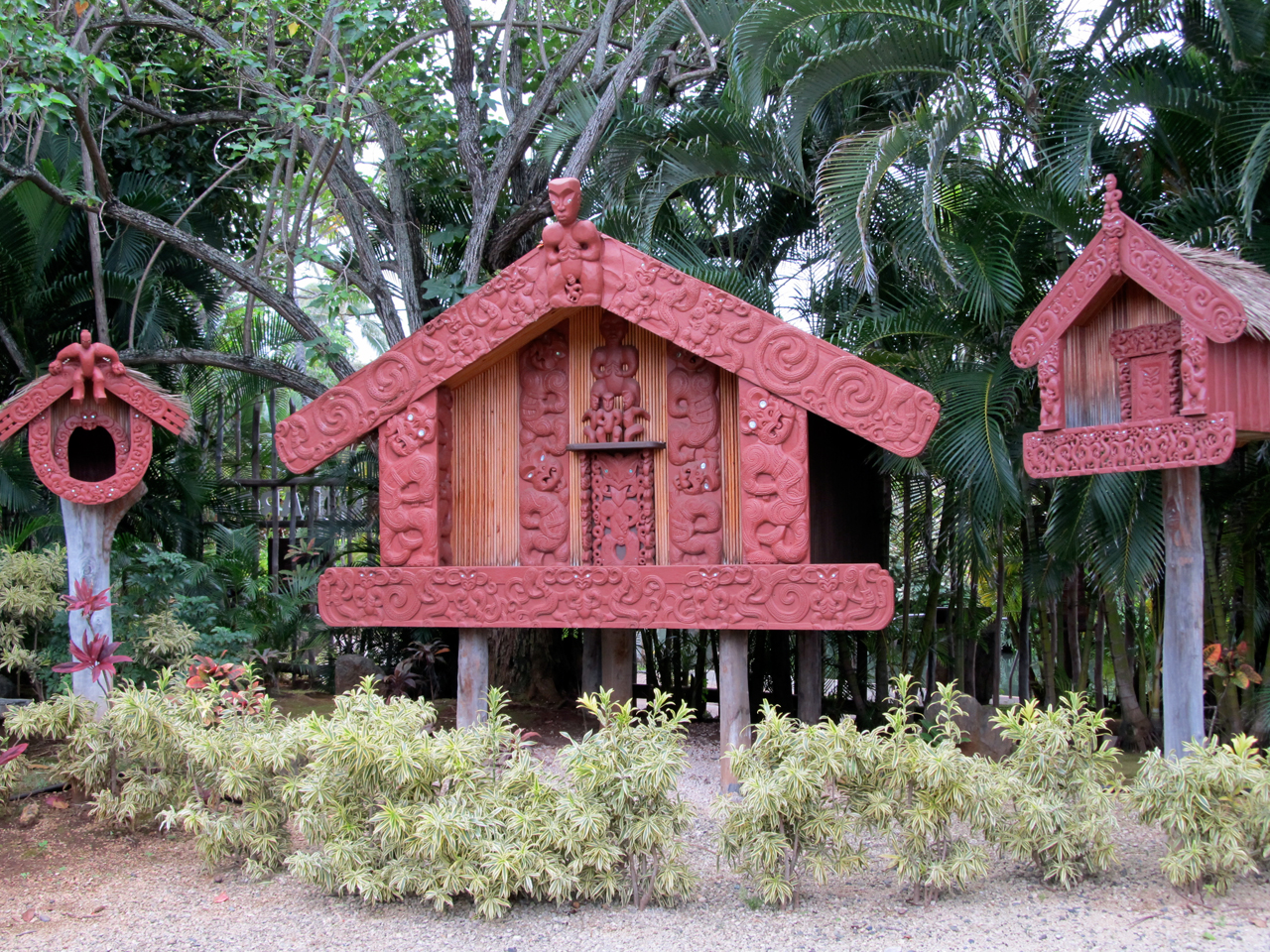
Māori pātaka (storehouses)

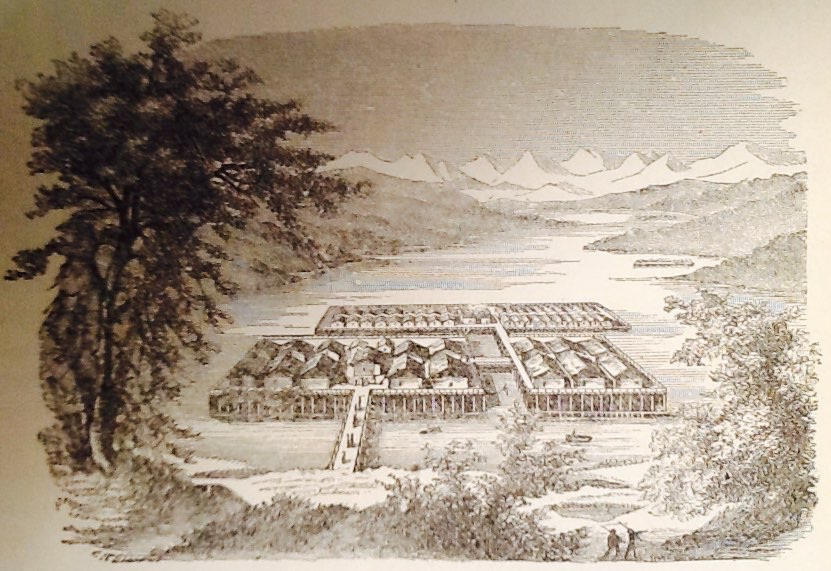
Lacustrine Village found in Lake Zurich, Switzerland

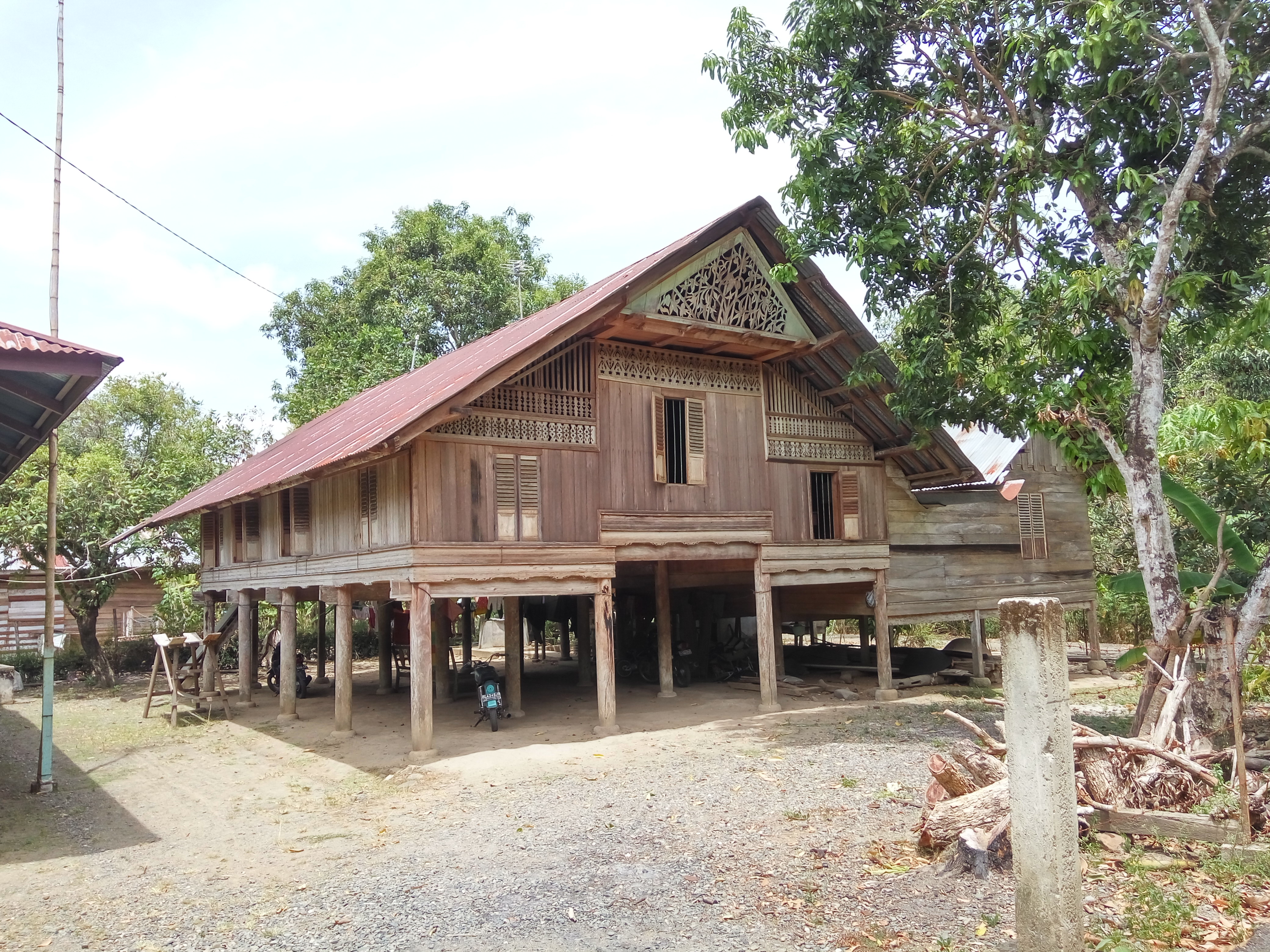
Rumoh Aceh, Acehnese traditional house

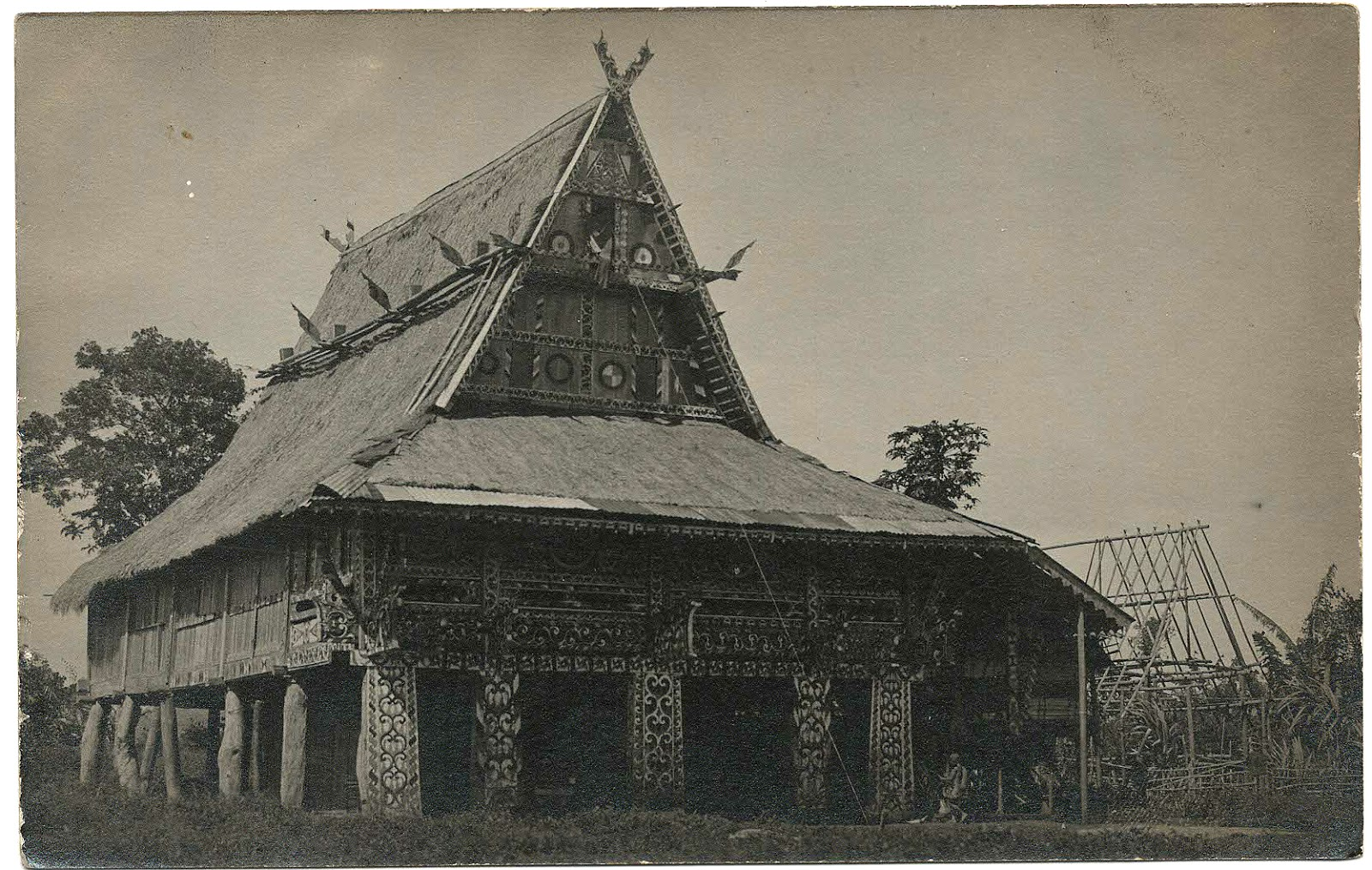
A torogan of the Maranao people of the Philippines (c. 1908-1924)

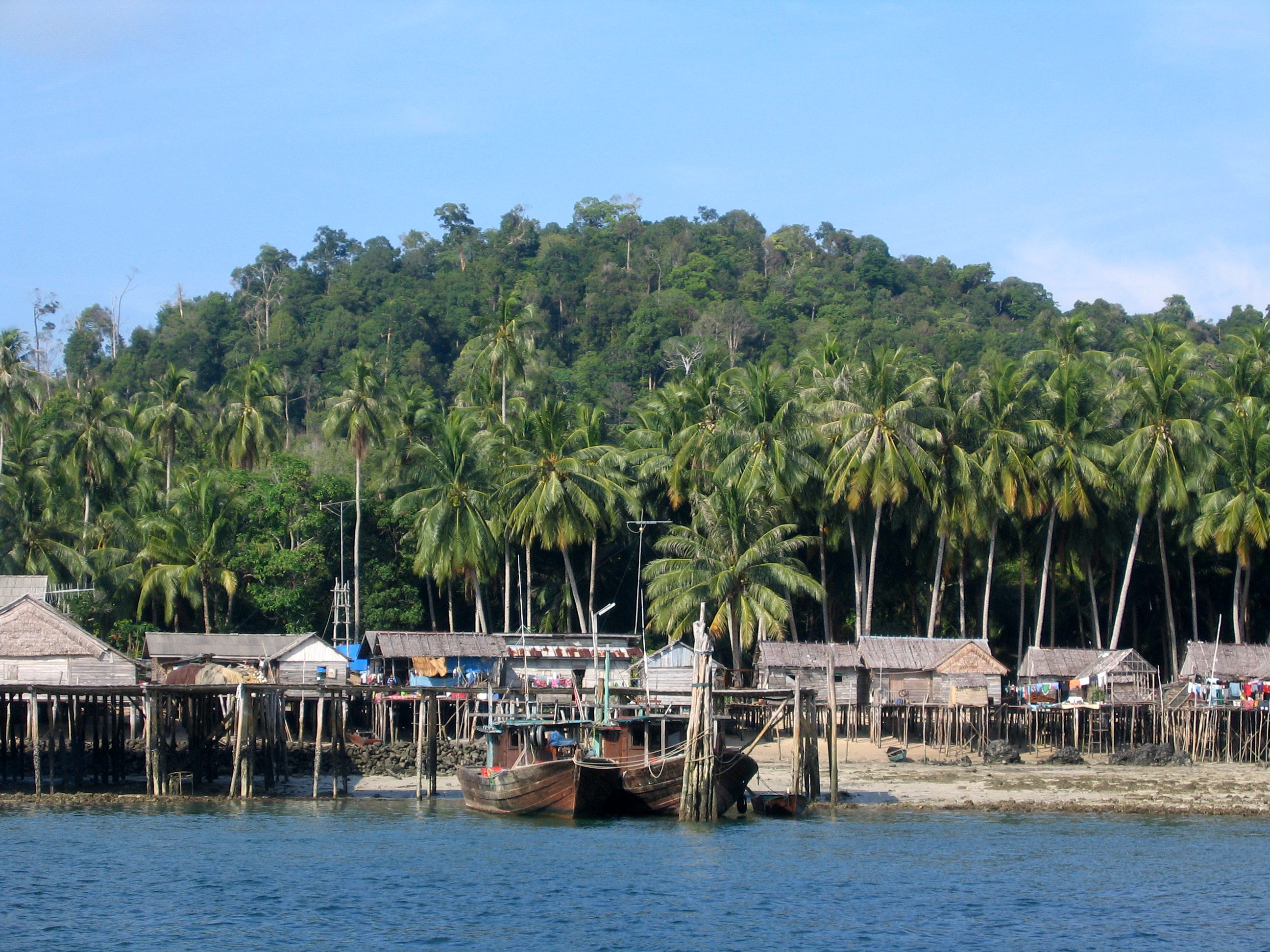
Stilt houses in Cempa, located in the Lingga Islands, Riau Islands, Indonesia

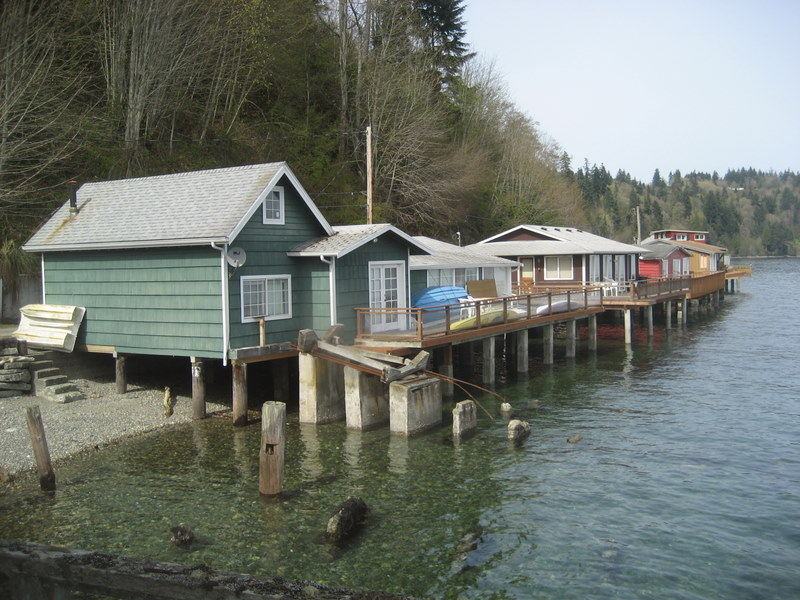
Stilt houses along Puget Sound in Fragaria, Washington, United States

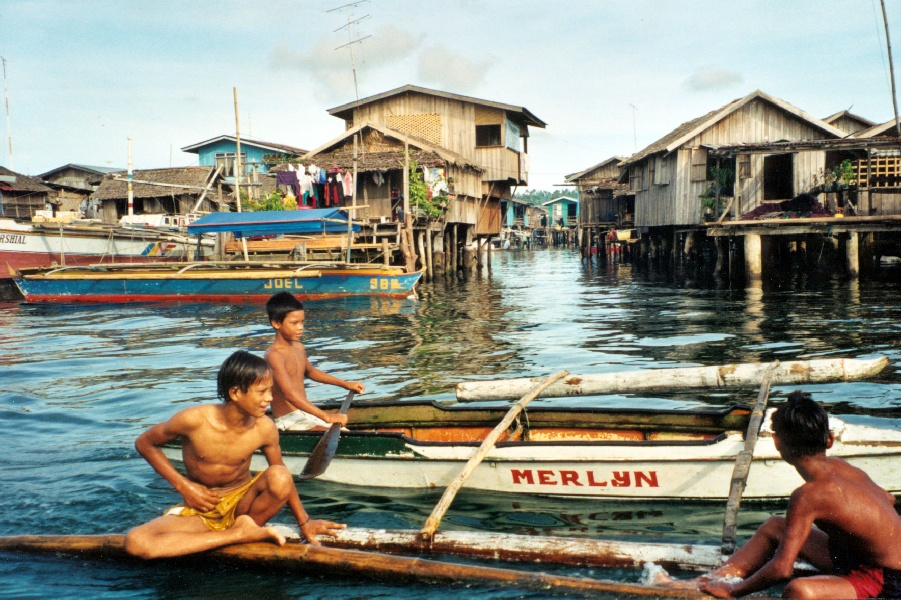
Bajau stilt houses over the sea in the Philippines

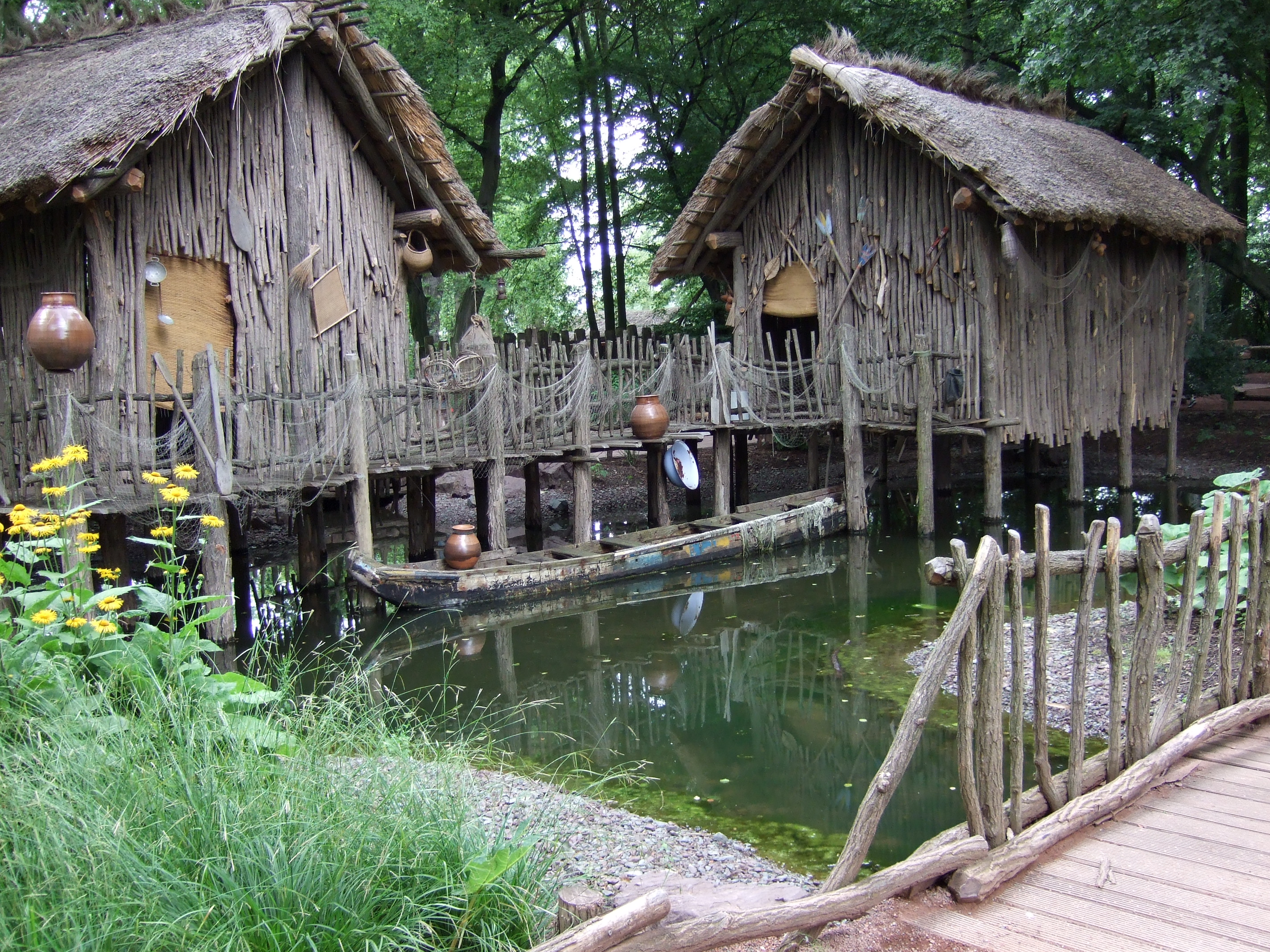
An African home reconstructed in Germany

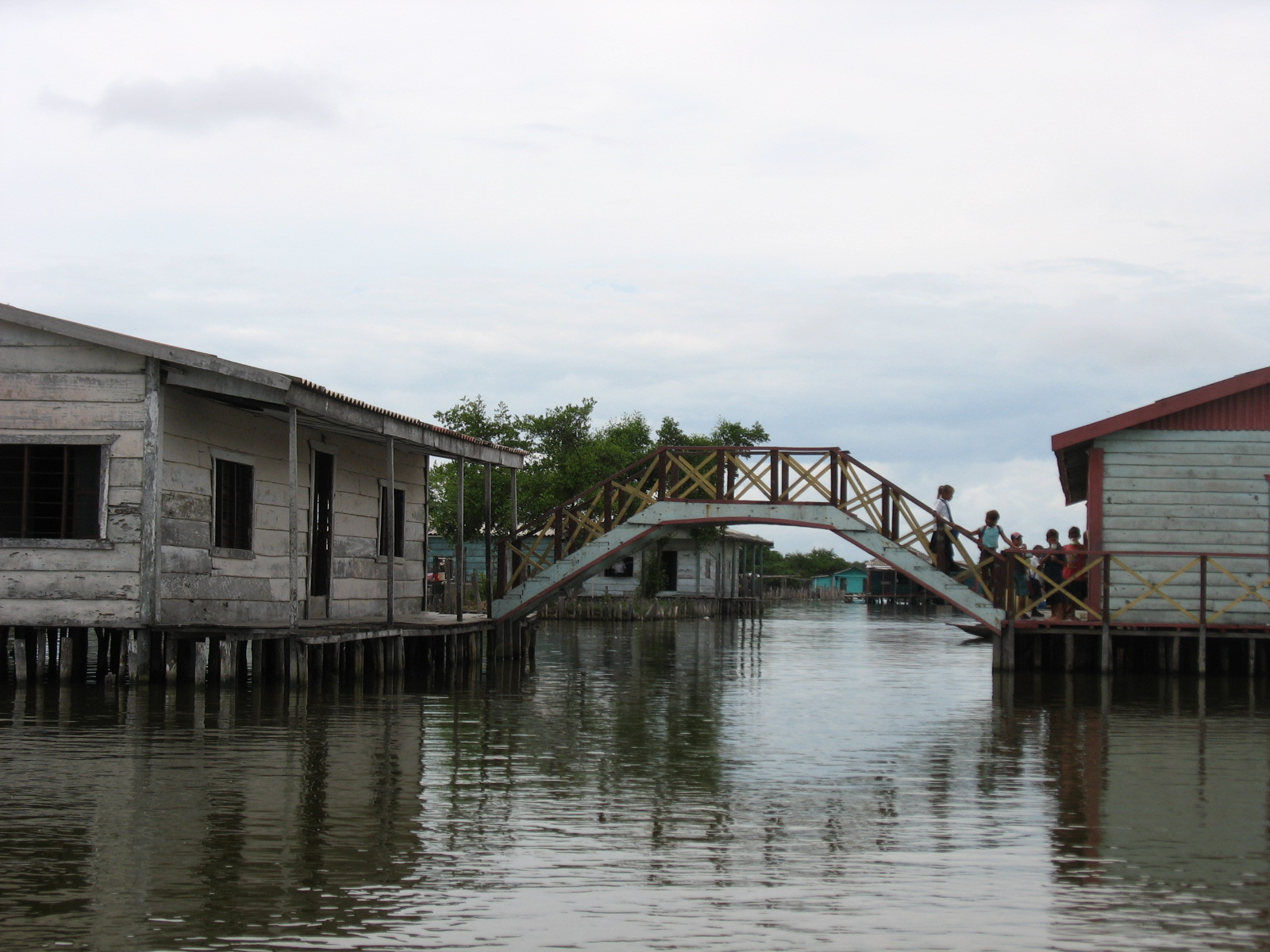
A bridge between stilt houses (palafito) in Colombia, in Ciénaga Grande de Santa Marta

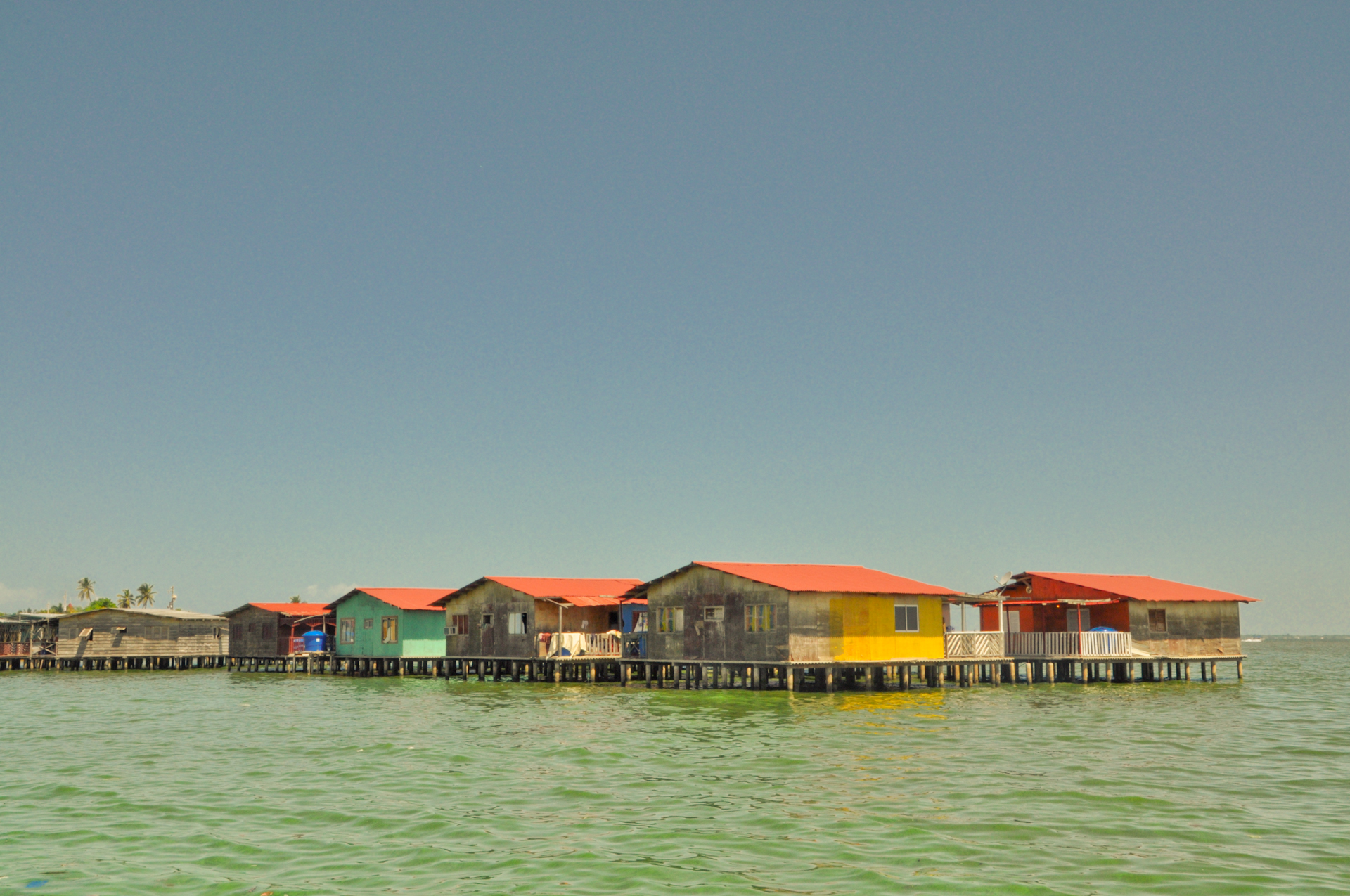
Stilt house on Lake Maracaibo, Zulia, Venezuela

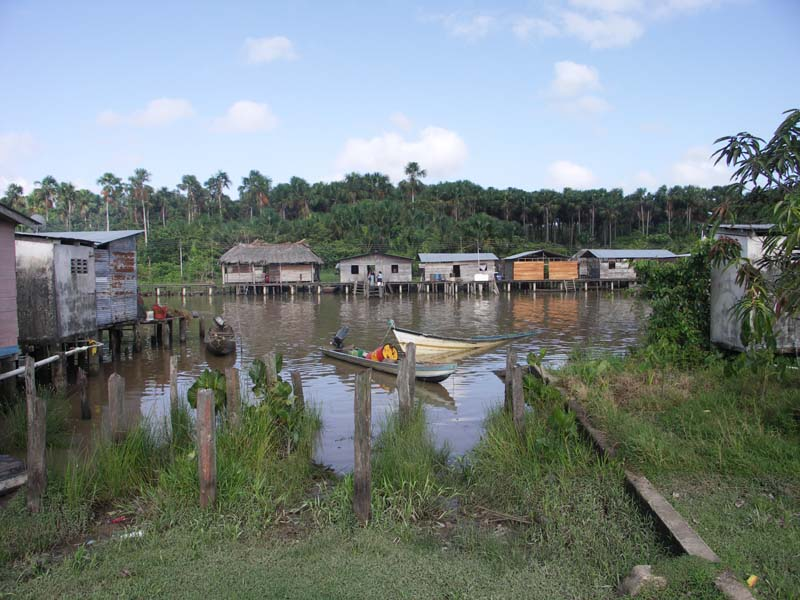
Stilt house on Curiapo, Delta Amacuro, Venezuela

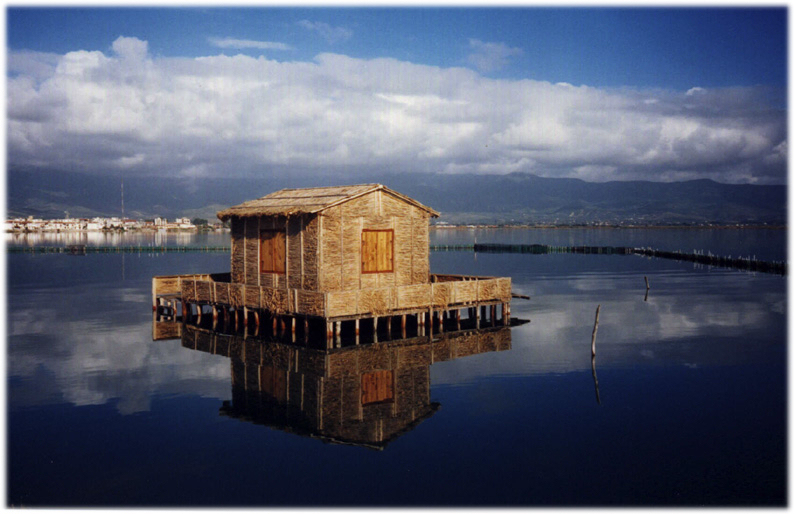
Traditional stilt house in the Missolonghi Lagoon, Western Greece, Greece

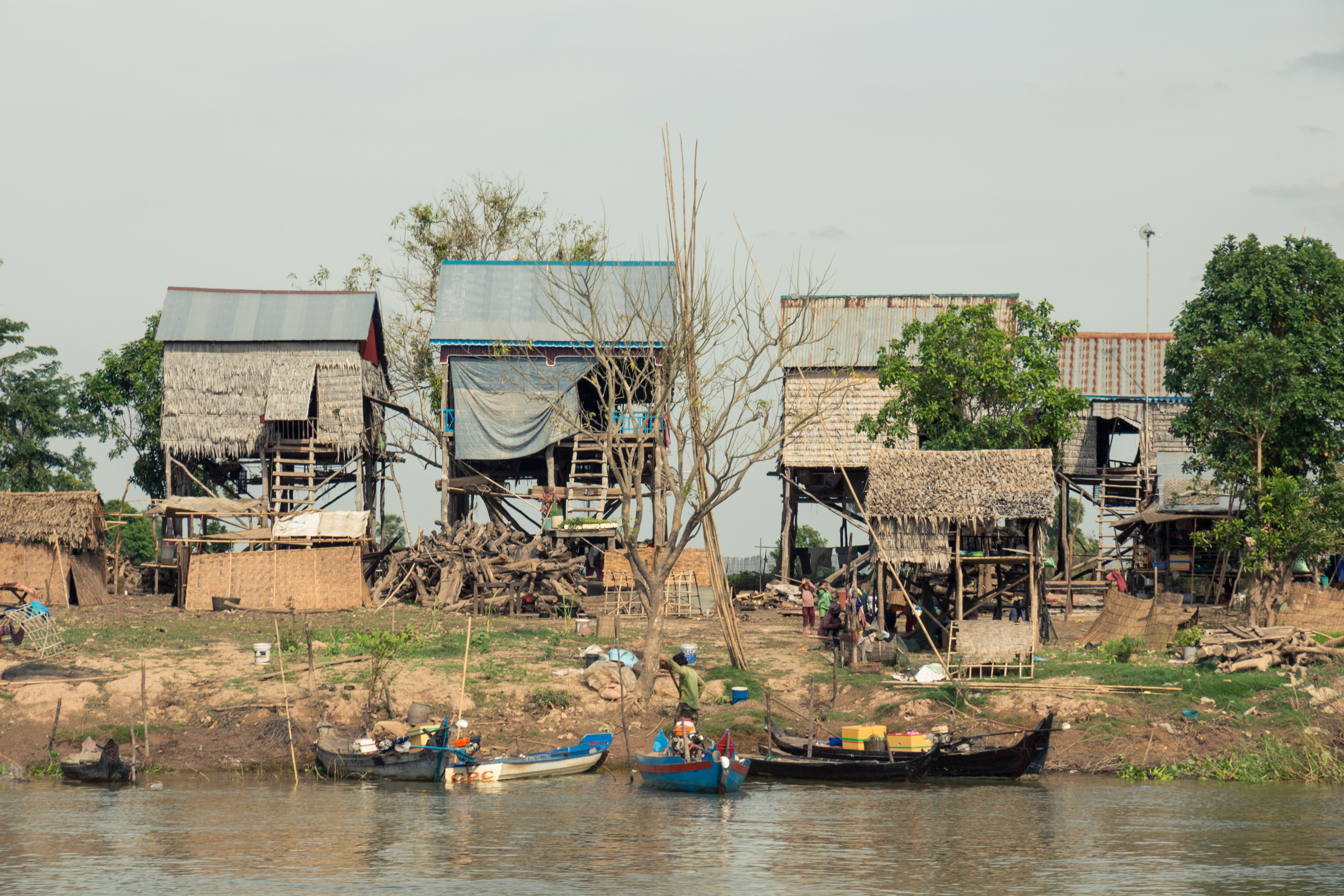
Stilt houses on Tonlé Sap Lake, Cambodia

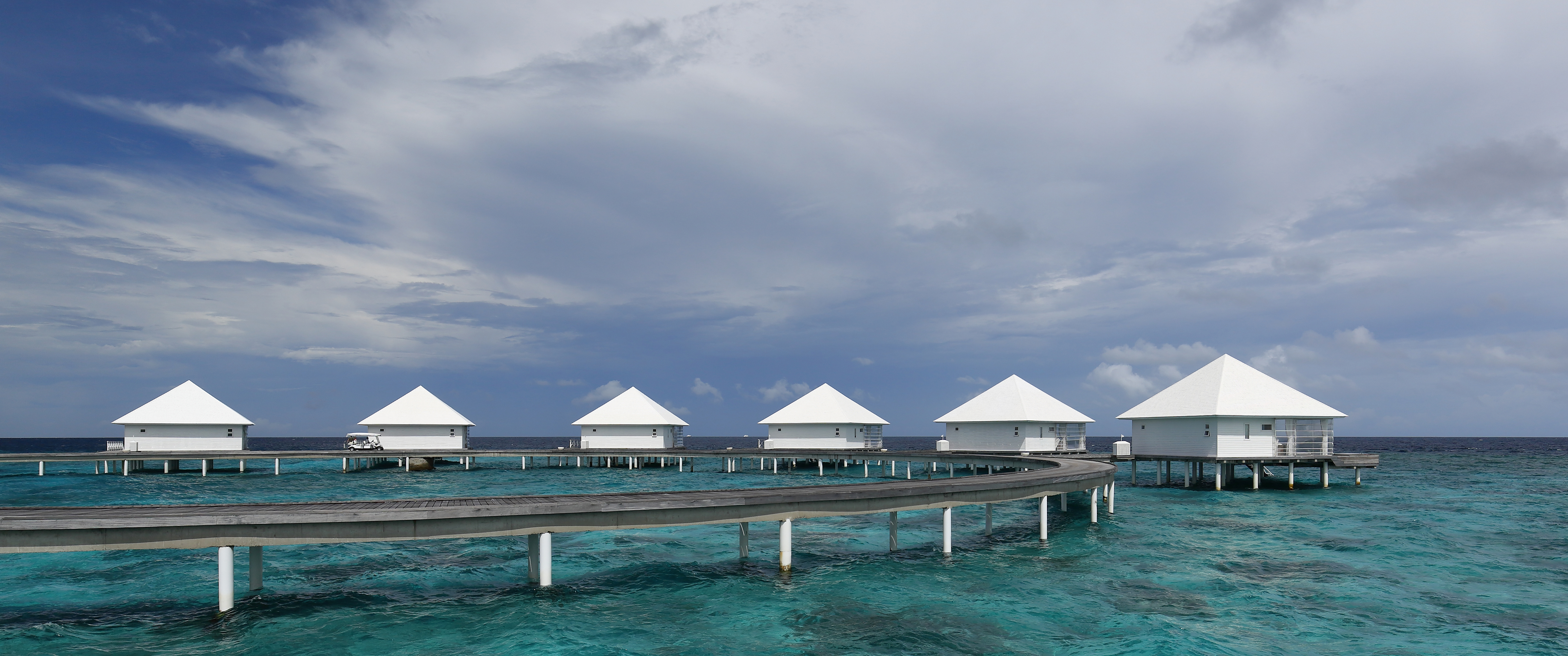
Vacation resort in the Maldives

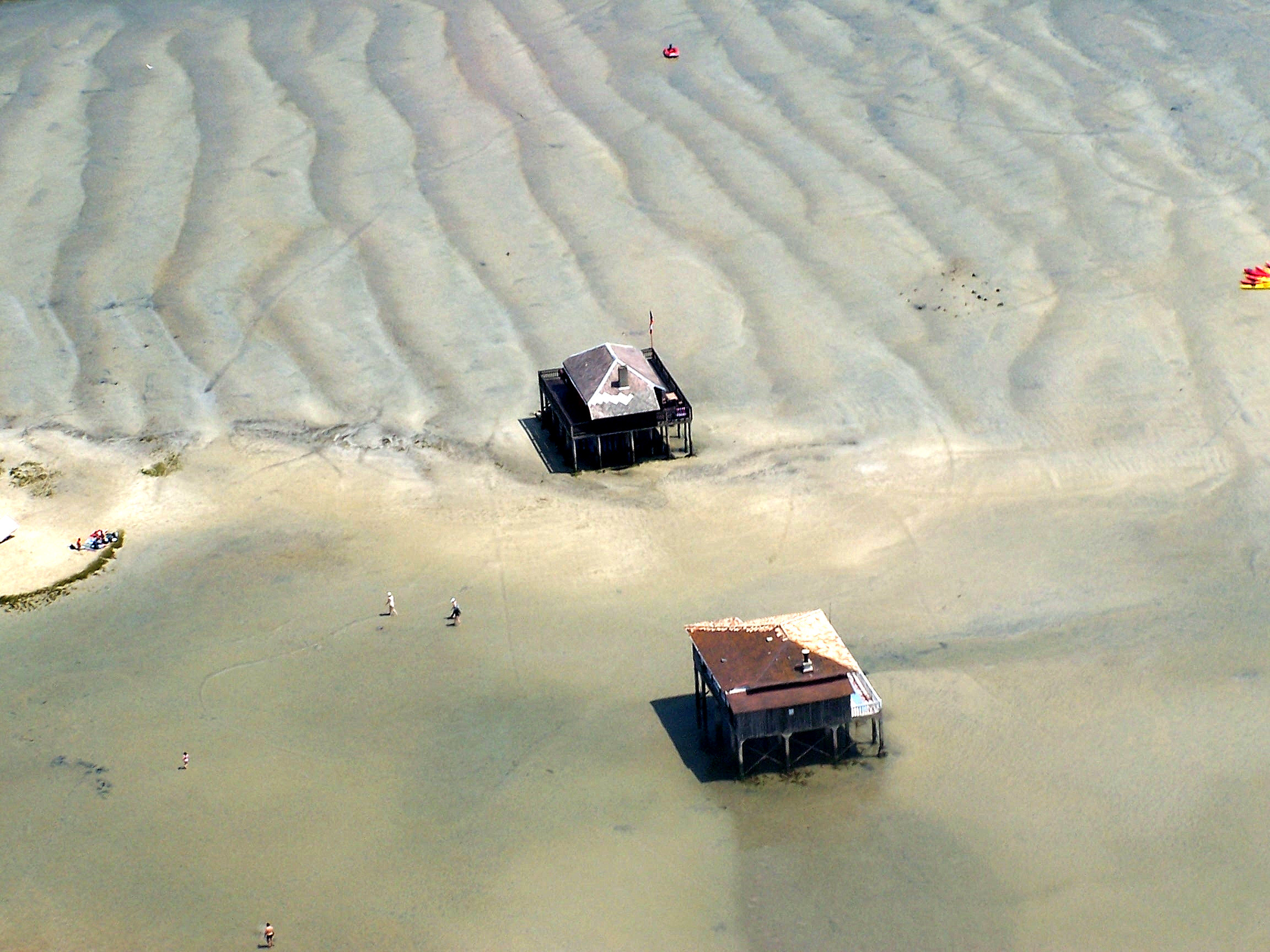
"Cabins on stilts", Arcachon Lagoon, France

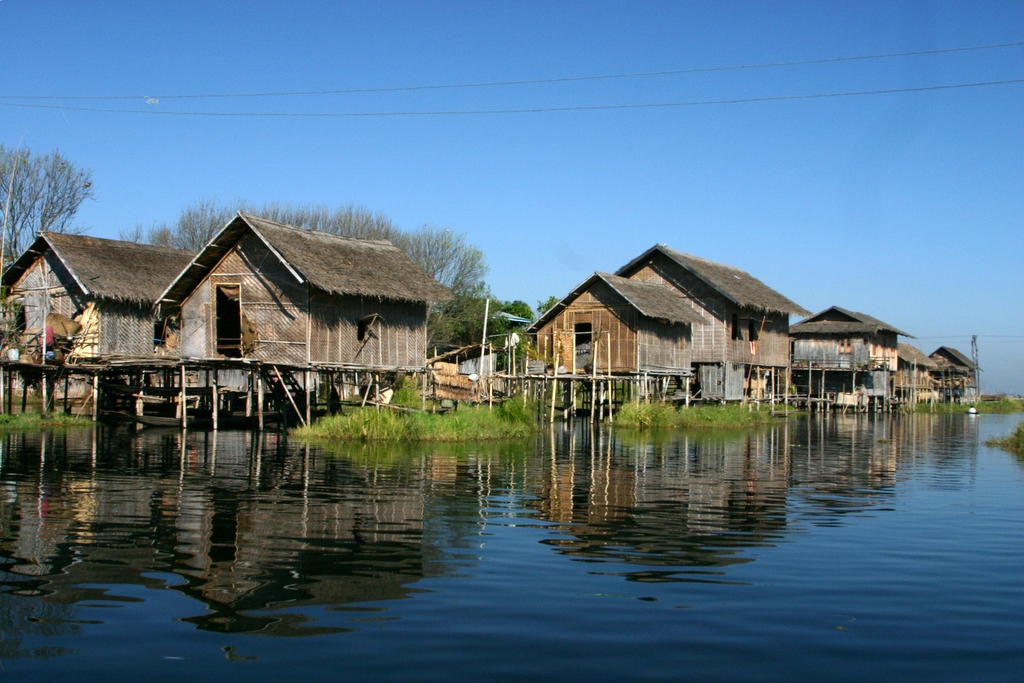
Stilt houses in Inle Lake, Myanmar

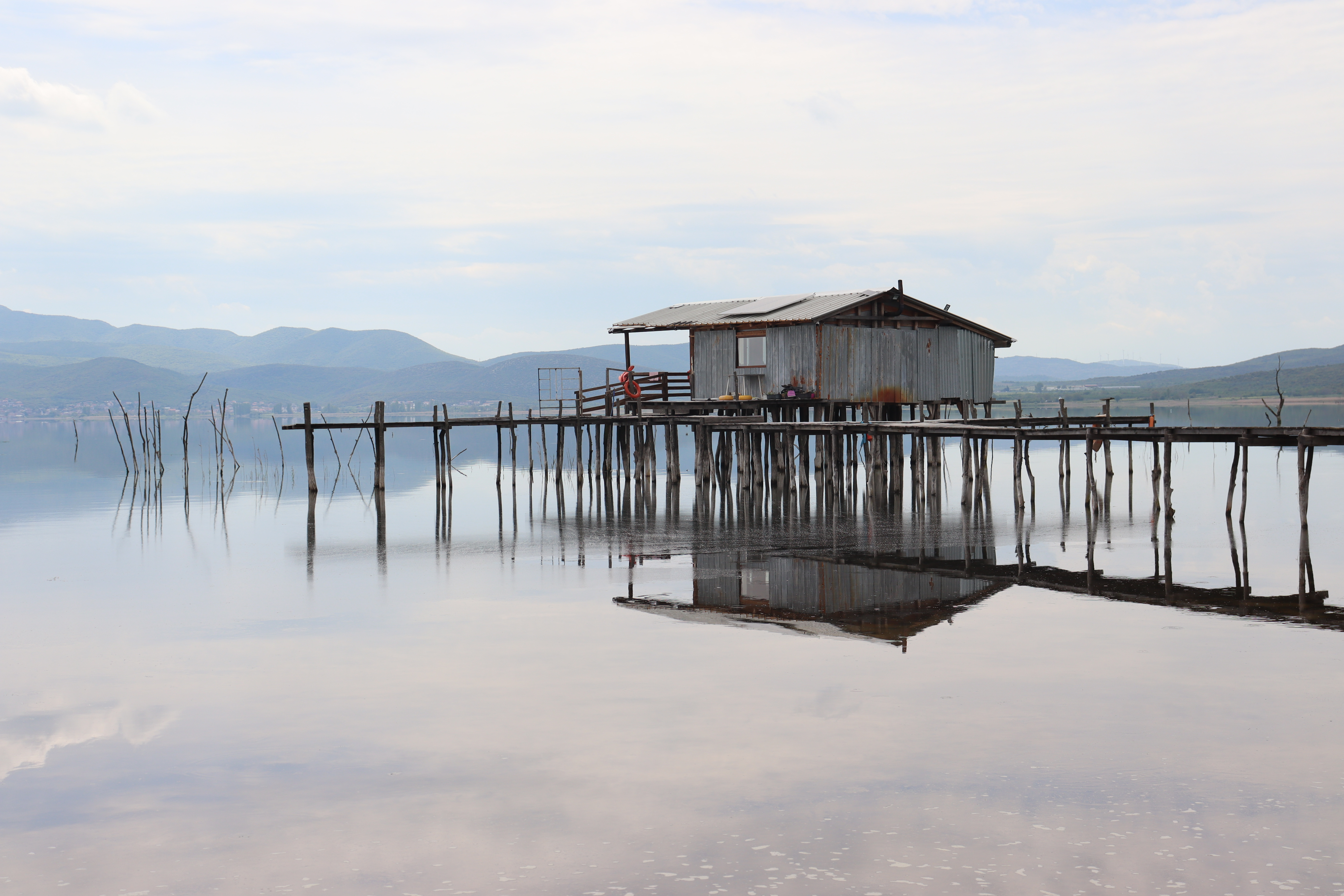
Stilt house in Doiran Lake

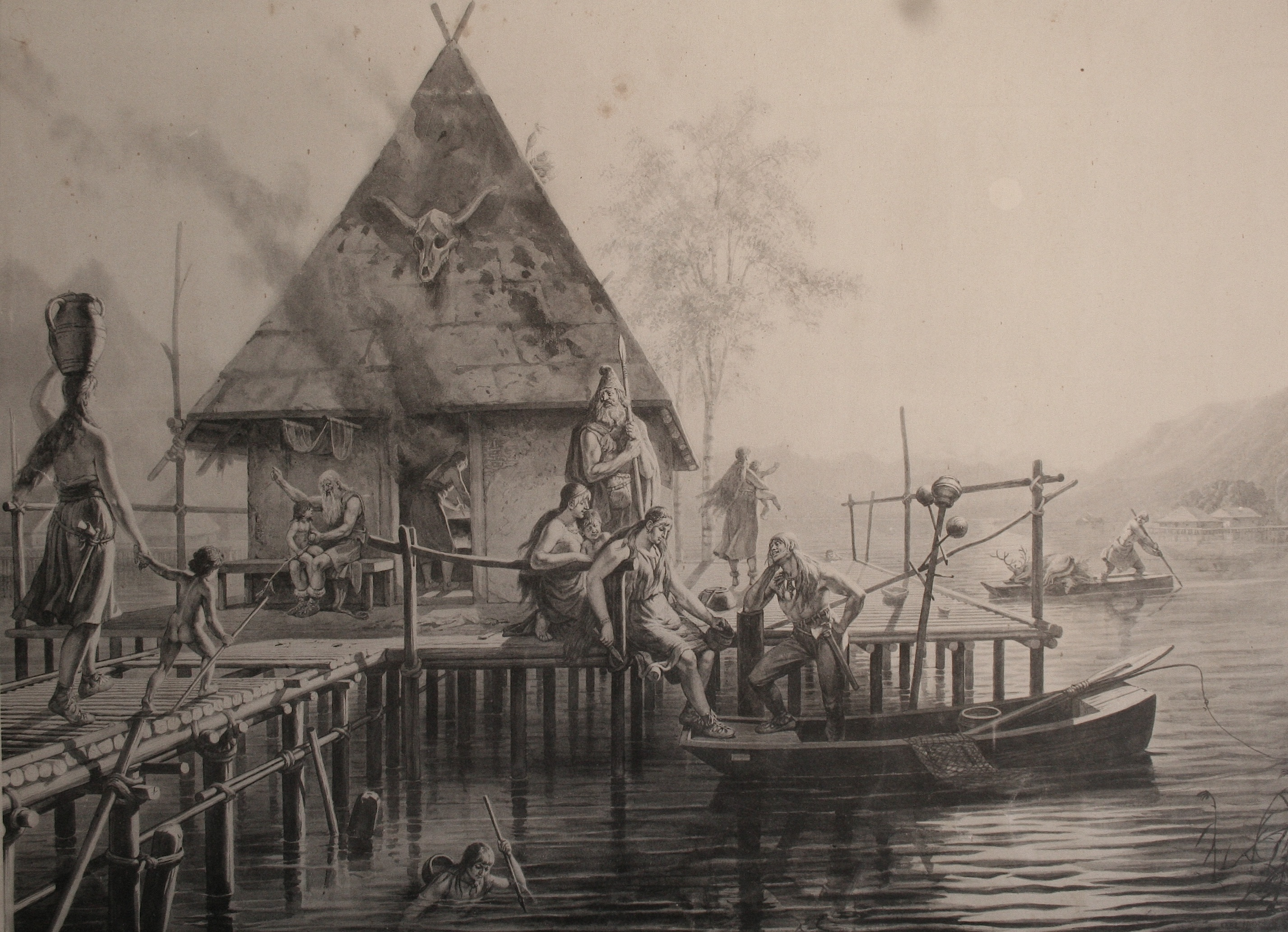
"Stiltshouse Dwellers" by Karl Jauslin, Stilthouse romanticism style

== See also ==
- Pfahlbaumuseum Unteruhldingen – an English-language article about the stilt house museum in Unteruhldingen, Germany
- Pit-house
- Post in ground
- Prehistoric pile dwellings around the Alps
- Rumah Melayu
- Stiltsville
- Treehouse
- Venice
- Wood pilings
- Stilthouse romanticism, idealized view of stiltshouse dwellers in Almine lake ares
