= Mary Magdalene in the Desert =

Painting by Emmanuel Benner

- Marie-Madeleine au désert (French)
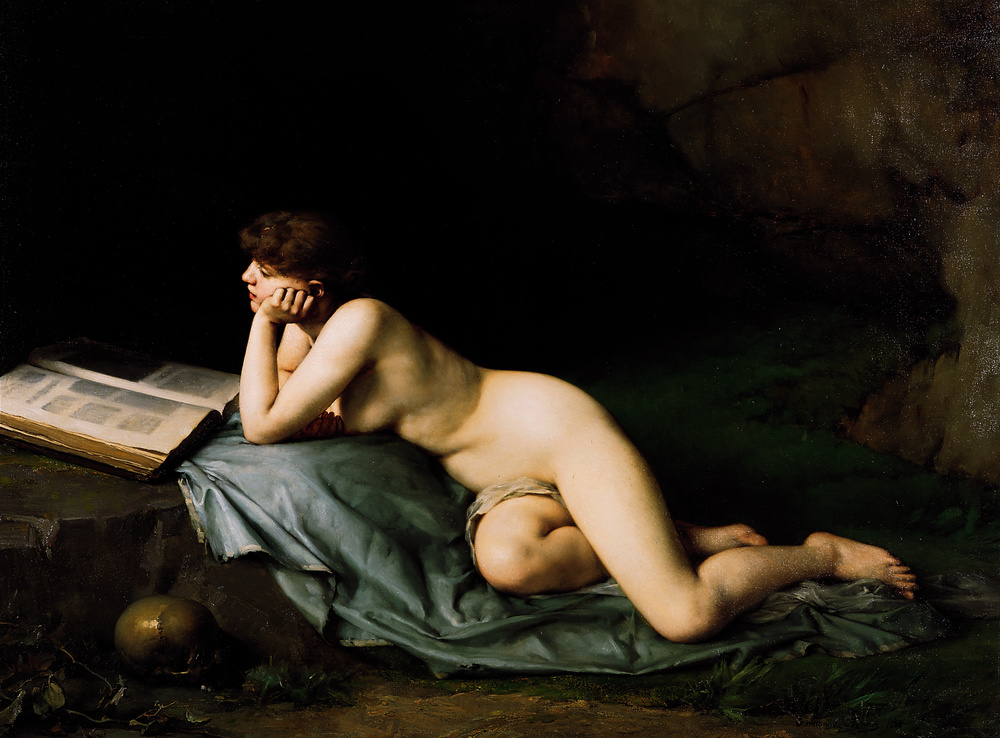
- Artist: Emmanuel Benner
- Year: 1886
- Medium: oil paint on canvas
- Movement: Academic art
- Subject: Mary Magdalene reading a book in the desert
- Dimensions: 131 cm × 175 cm (52 in × 69 in)
- Location: Musée d'Art moderne et contemporain, Strasbourg
- Accession: 1895

Mary Magdalene in the Desert (French: Marie-Madeleine au désert) is an 1886 painting by Emmanuel Benner (1836-1896). It is now in the Strasbourg Museum of Modern and Contemporary Art. Its inventory number is 55.974.0.163.

The painting is a depiction of Mary Magdalene as a voluptuous nude woman, who appears reclined while reading a folio in what is purportedly a cave in a desert. The painting was exhibited at the Salon de 1886 in Paris.
