= A Family in the Stone Age =

Painting by Emmanuel Benner

- Une famille à l'âge de pierre (French)
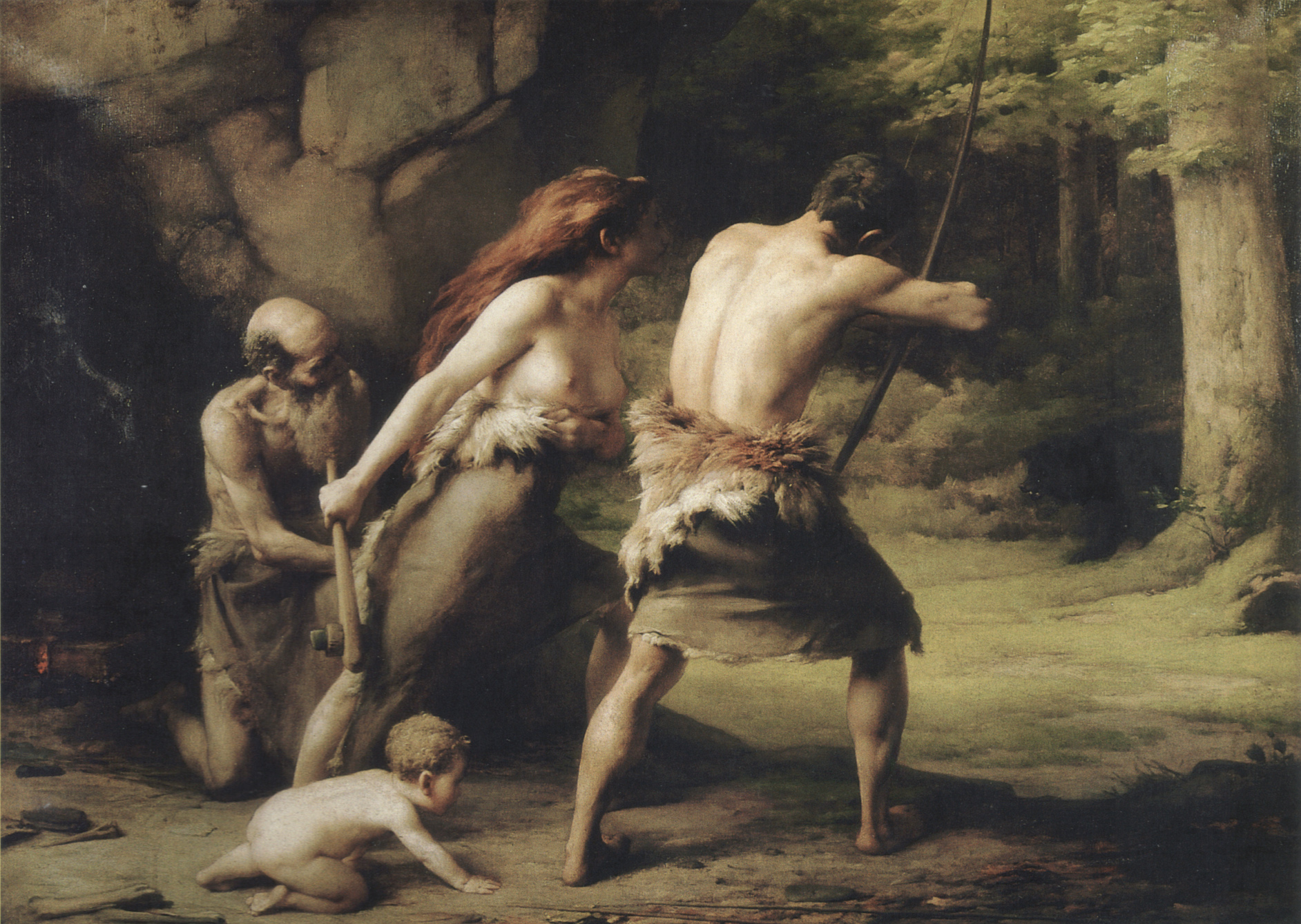
- Artist: Emmanuel Benner
- Year: 1892
- Medium: oil paint on canvas
- Movement: Academic art History painting
- Subject: A scene from Neolithic Europe.
- Dimensions: 110 cm × 147 cm (43 in × 58 in)
- Location: Unterlinden Museum, Colmar
- Accession: 1907

A Family in the Stone Age (French: Une famille à l'âge de pierre) is an 1892 oil on canvas painting by the Academic artist Emmanuel Benner, now in the Unterlinden Museum in Colmar, Alsace, France (inventory number 88.RP.24).

== History ==
The painting was exhibited at the 1892 Salon de Paris (catalog #122), under the French title L’alerte ; âge de pierre (The Alarm ; The Stone Age).

== Description ==
Like Benner's 1878 Lakeside Dwelling, the painting depicts a scene from life in prehistoric times; here the artist shows three generations of a family of cave dwellers facing the threat of a bear. The Stone Age family is composed of four people, the father, who is aiming at the bear with his bow and arrow, a mother, a child, and an old man, probably the child's grandfather. They are all dressed in a primitive way, covered in animal skins, and the child, who is crouching in the ground, is entirely naked. The woman has her breasts exposed and is holding a club. The old man is bald and bearded, and is kneeling, while he watches the scene.

== Provenance ==
The painting was donated to the museum by the artist's family, including his nephew, painter Many Benner.
