= Lakeside Dwelling =

Painting by Emmanuel Benner

- Habitation lacustre (French)
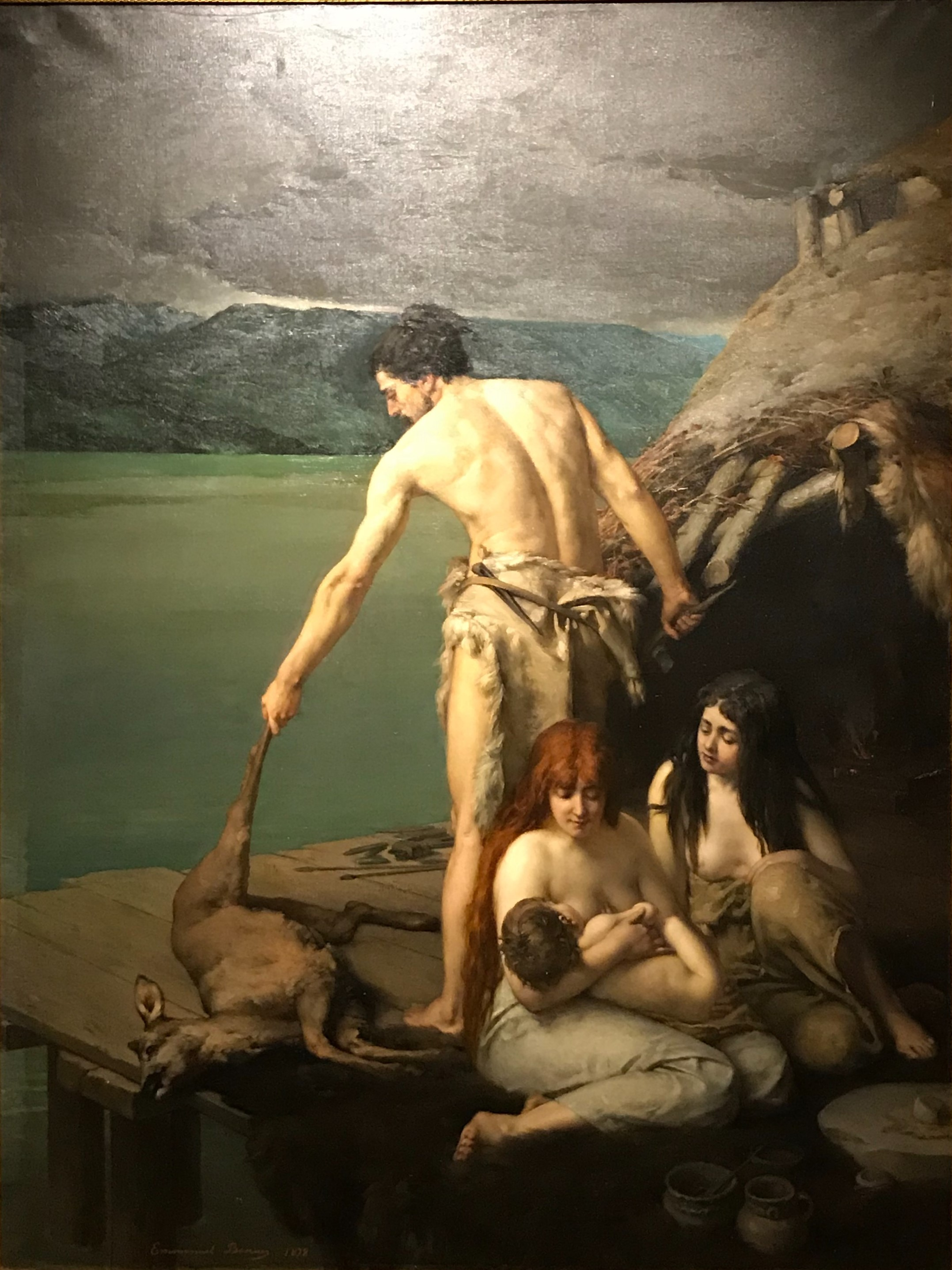
- Artist: Emmanuel Benner
- Year: 1878
- Medium: oil paint on canvas
- Movement: Academic art History painting
- Subject: A scene from Neolithic Europe.
- Dimensions: 158 cm × 117 cm (62 in × 46 in)
- Location: Musée des Beaux-Arts, Mulhouse
- Accession: 1883

Lakeside Dwelling (Habitation lacustre) is an 1878 oil painting by Emmanuel Benner (1836-1896). It is now in the Musée des Beaux-Arts de Mulhouse. Its inventory number is D.62.1.23.

The painting was displayed at the 1878 Paris Salon under the more specific title Une famille lacustre, au lac de Bienne (Suisse), i. e. A Family of Lake Dwellers, by Lake Biel (Switzerland). It is one of several Prehistory-themed paintings made by Benner. Discoveries made around Lake Zurich in 1854 had popularized the (now discredited) scientific image of ancient populations living in stilt houses built on Swiss lakes. In reality, these populations mostly lived on the shores.

== See also ==
- A Family in the Stone Age
- Prehistoric pile dwellings around Lake Zurich
- Stone Age
