= Emmanuel Benner =

French painter

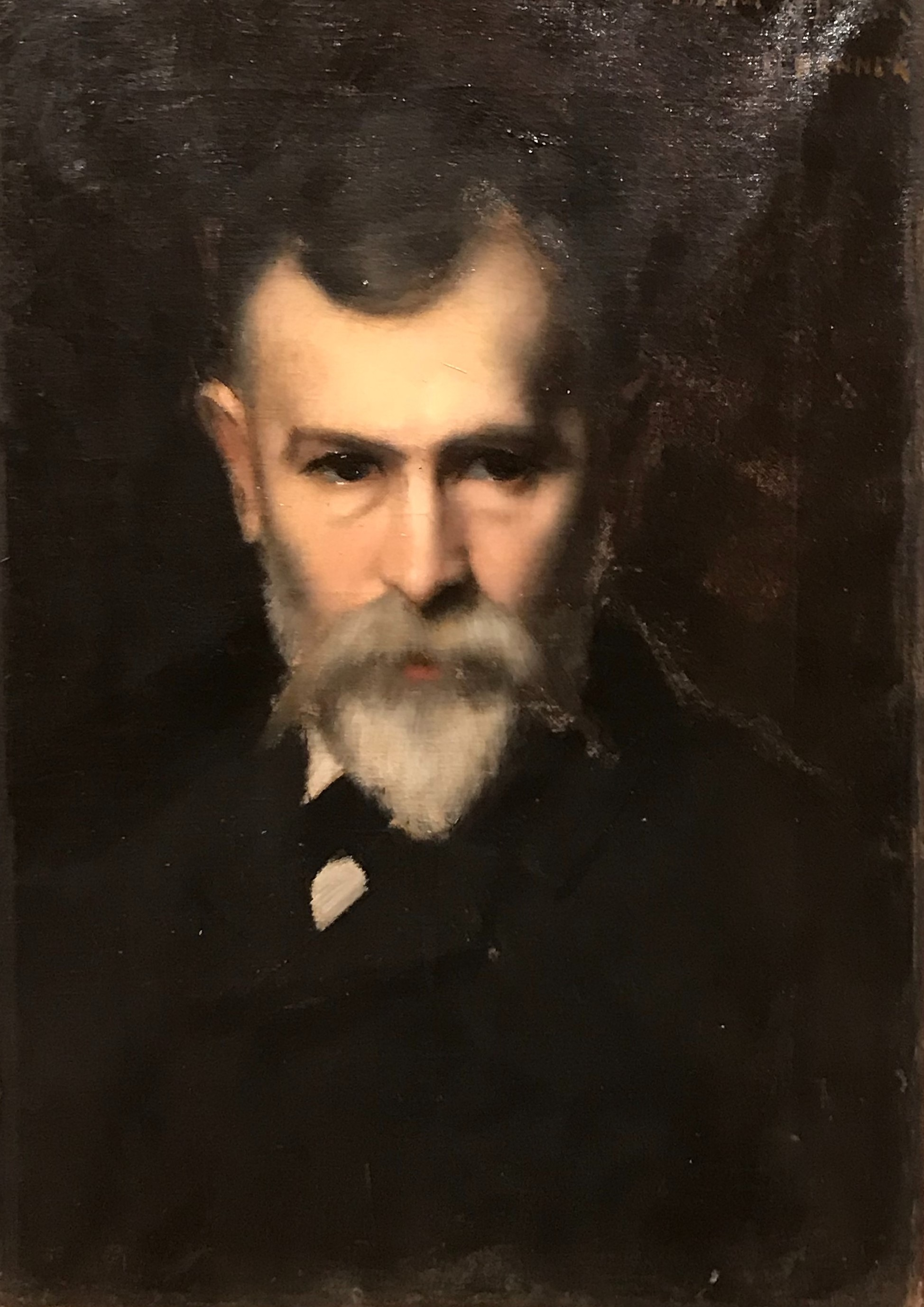
- Benner in 1890 (painting by Jean-Jacques Henner, Musée des Beaux-Arts de Mulhouse)
- Born: March 28, 1836; Mulhouse, France
- Died: February 23, 1896 (aged 59); Nantes, France
- Resting place: Père Lachaise Cemetery
- Known for: Nude paintings
- Notable work: Mary Magdalene in the Desert; Lakeside Dwelling
- Style: Academic art

Emmanuel Benner (28 March 1836 – 23 September 1896) was a French Academic painter and draughtsman. The son of the painter Jean Benner-Fries, he was twin to fellow artist, Jean Benner, and the uncle of the painter Emmanuel Michel Benner, Jean's son. Like his twin brother, he was portrayed by fellow Alsatian, Jean-Jacques Henner.

== Biography ==
Emmanuel Benner was born in Mulhouse. He studied under his father, and under Jean-Jacques Eck (1812–1887) at the School for industrial design (école de dessin industriel) of Mulhouse, then in Paris with Henner and with Léon Bonnat. He started exhibiting paintings at the Salon de Paris in 1867 and would do so regularly until his death. The Benner twins also collaborated as designers with their other fellow Alsatian, ceramist and potter Théodore Deck. Their styles being very similar, they occasionally worked together on a painting, such as the Allégorie de l’Exposition Universelle de Paris en 1878, filled with beautiful women, one of their favourite subjects.

Benner died in 1896 in Nantes. He is buried with his brother and his nephew in the family tomb in Père Lachaise Cemetery, in Paris.

== Collections ==
Benner's work is held in the permanent collections of the Victoria and Albert Museum, the Musée des Beaux-Arts de Mulhouse, the Walters Art Museum, the Strasbourg Museum of Modern and Contemporary Art, the Unterlinden Museum, the Musée d'Orsay, among others.

== Gallery ==
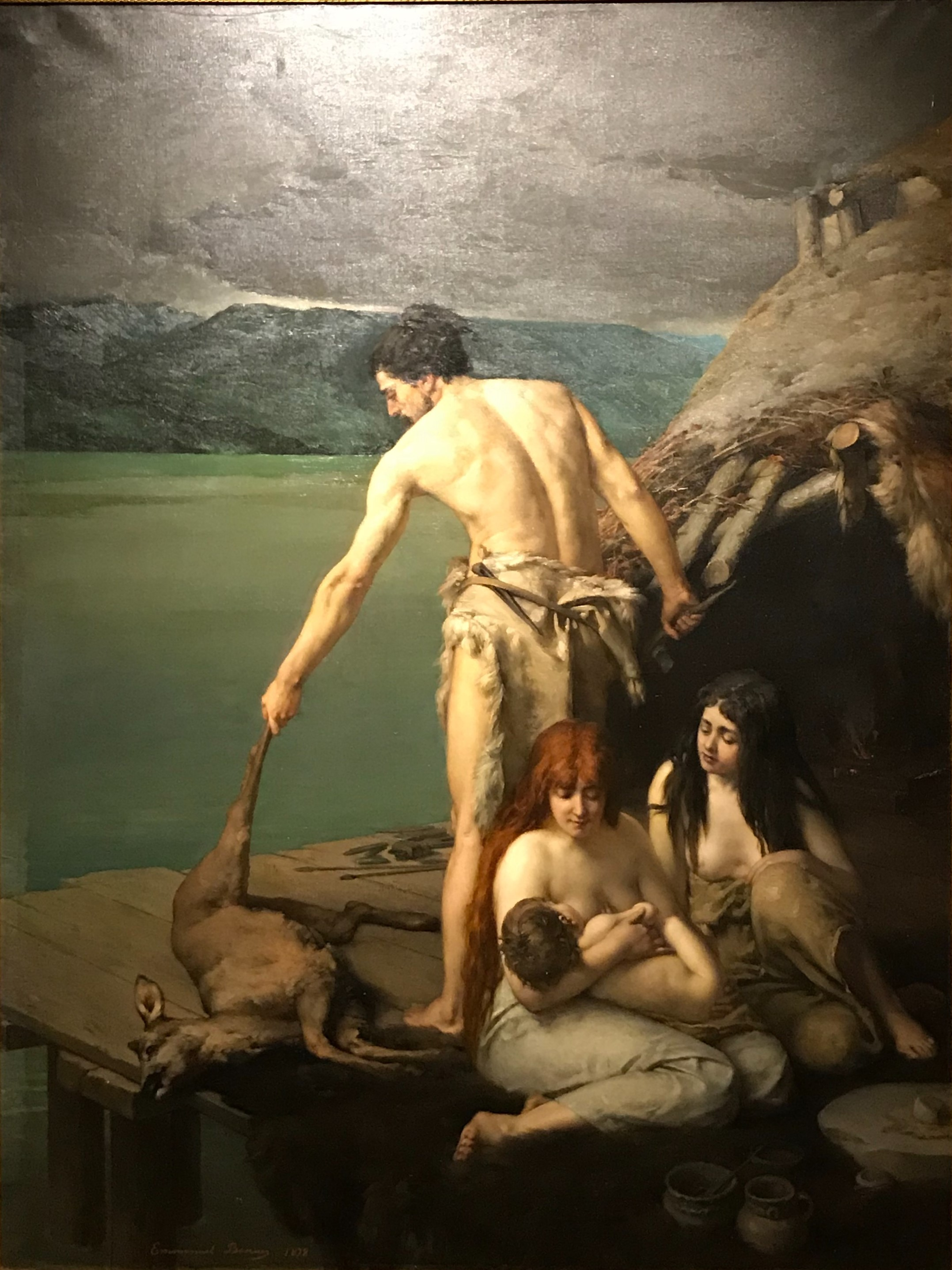
Lakeside Dwelling (1878, Musée des Beaux-Arts de Mulhouse)

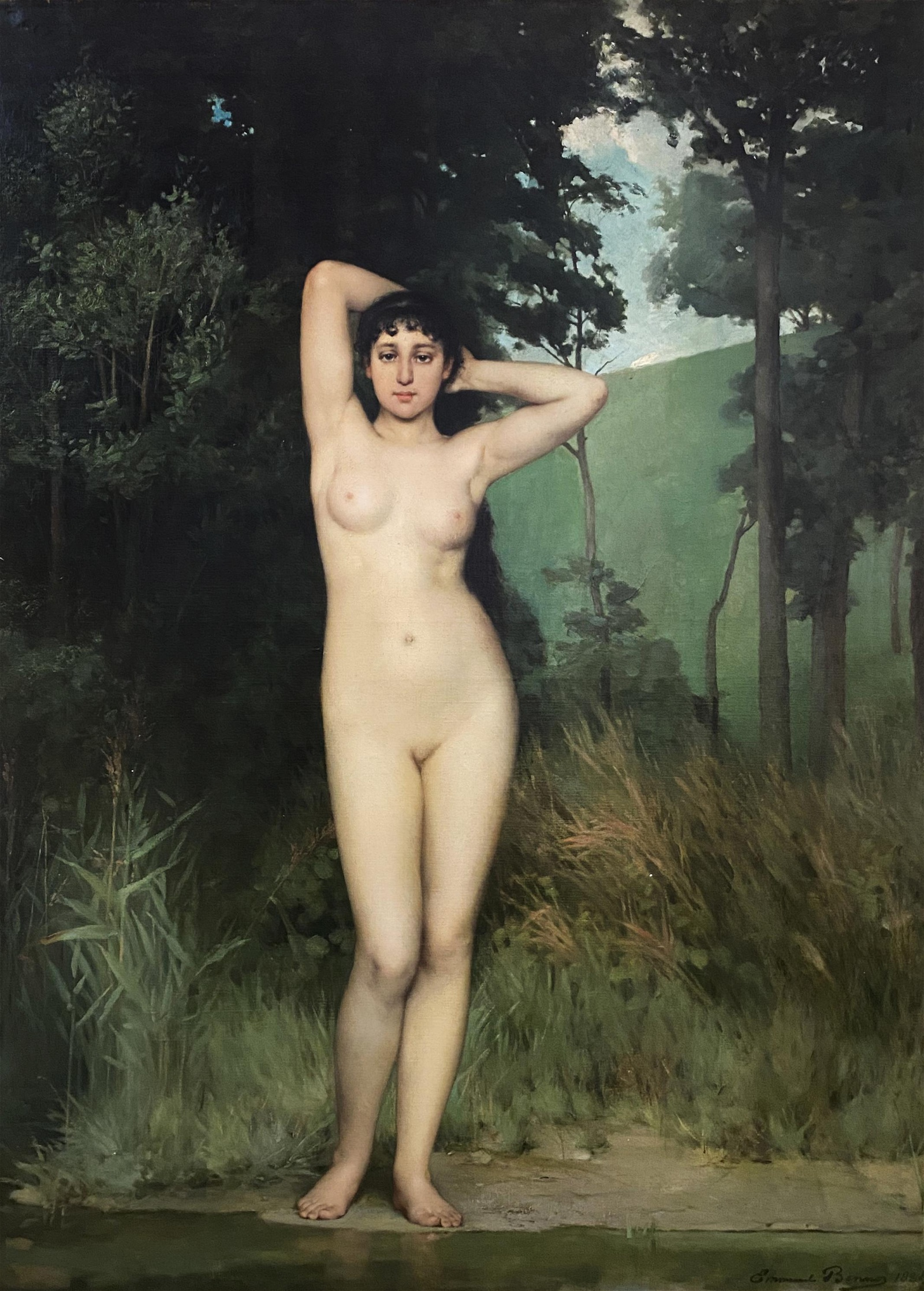
Nude Woman by a River (1884, private collection)

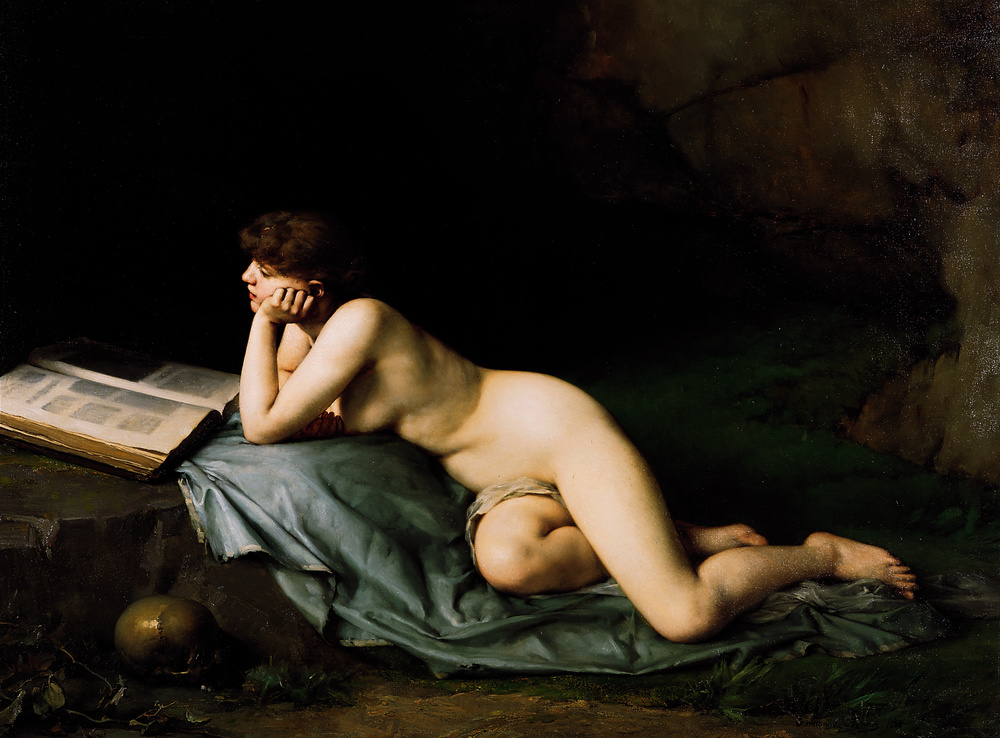
Mary Magdalene in the Desert (1886, Strasbourg Museum of Modern and Contemporary Art)

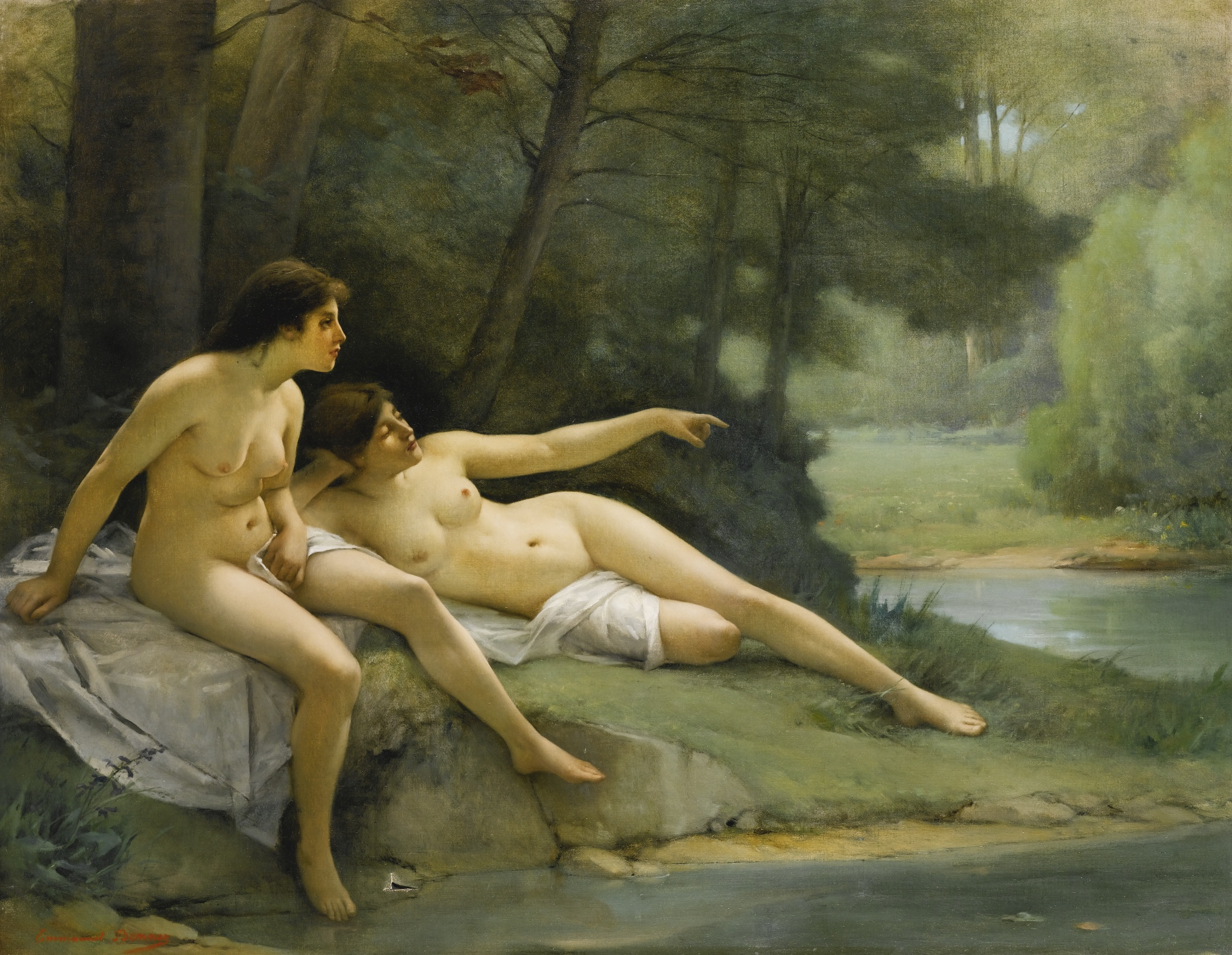
Nudes in the Woods (undated, private collection)

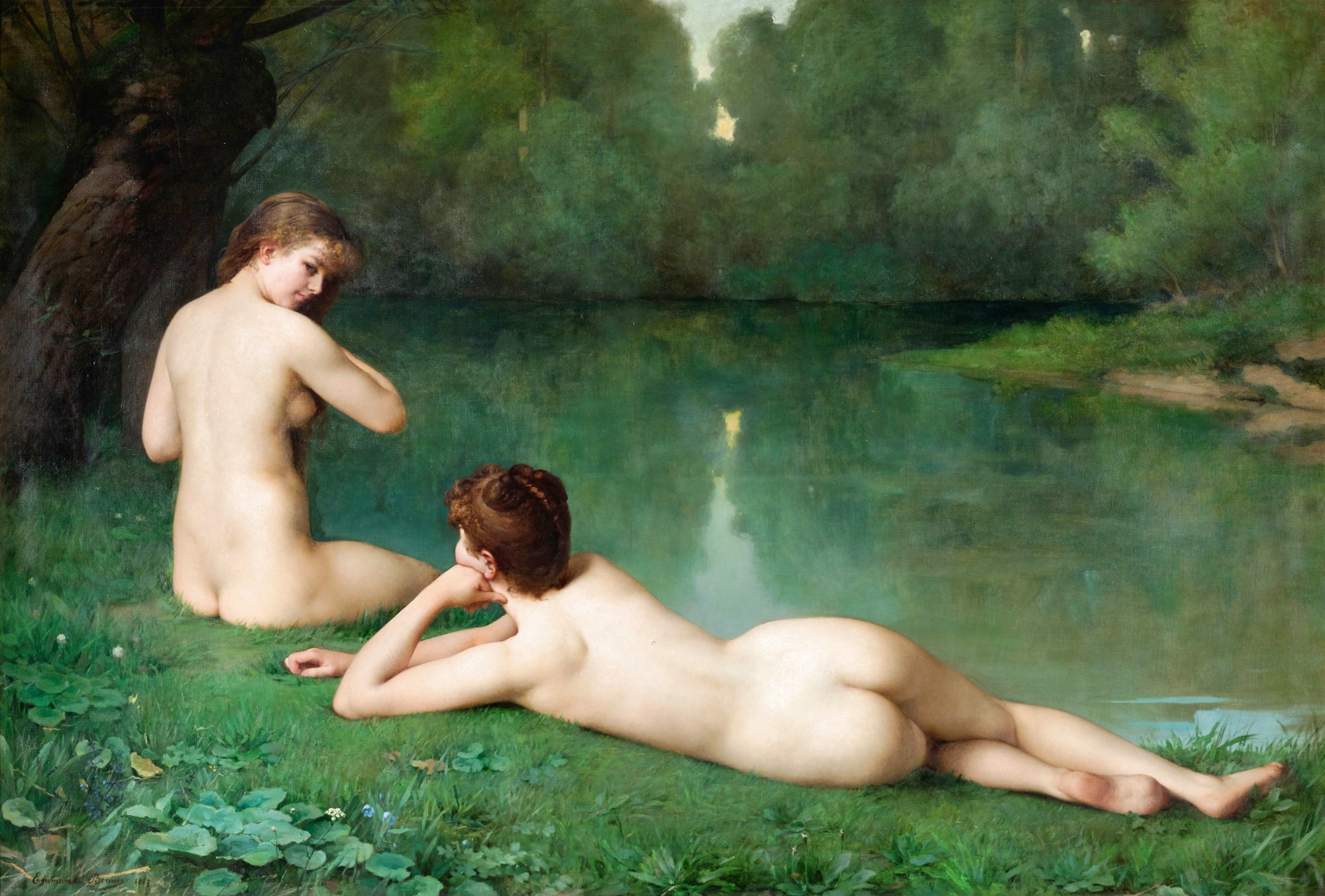
At the Water's Edge (1887, private collection)

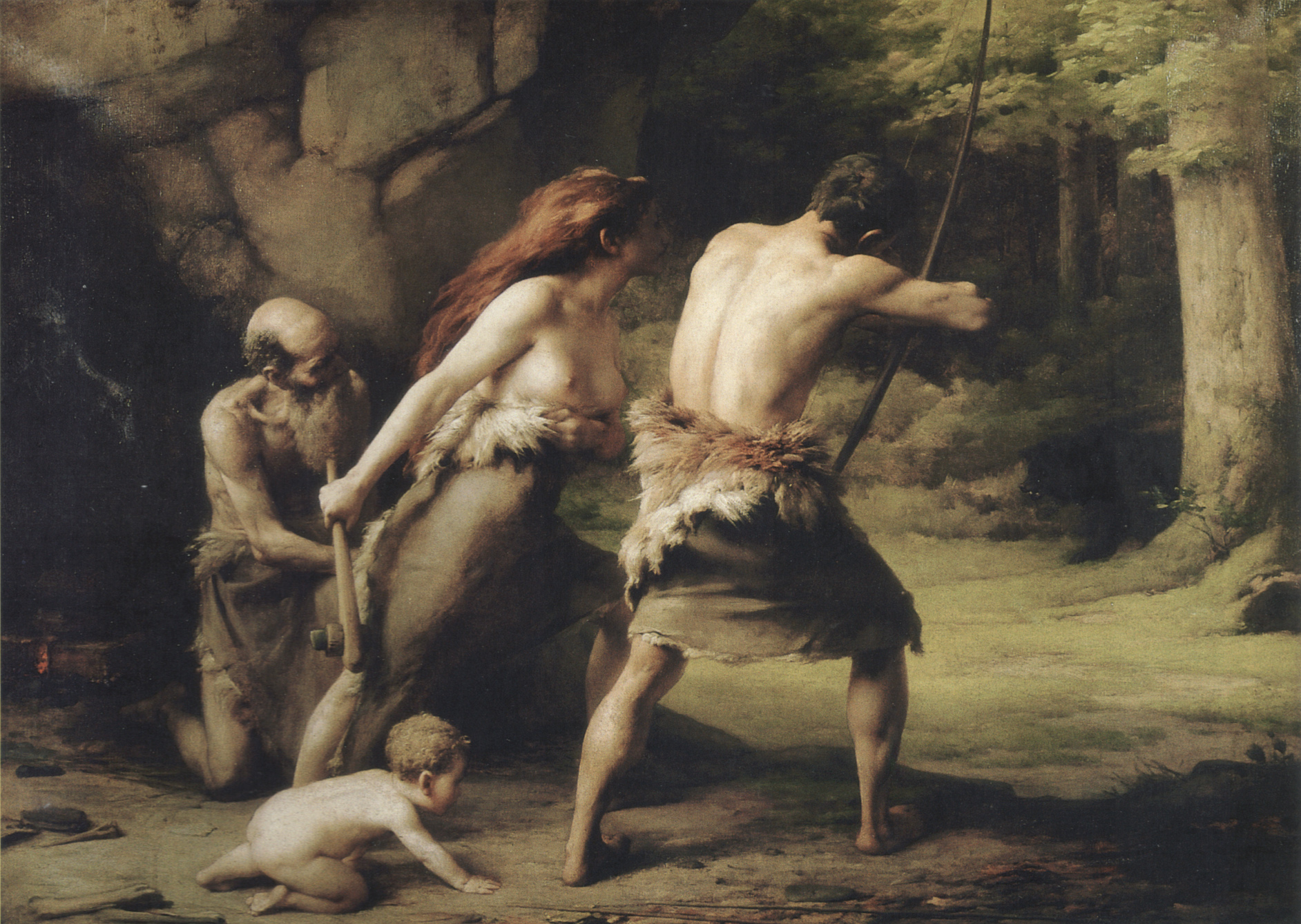
A Family in the Stone Age (1892, Unterlinden Museum)

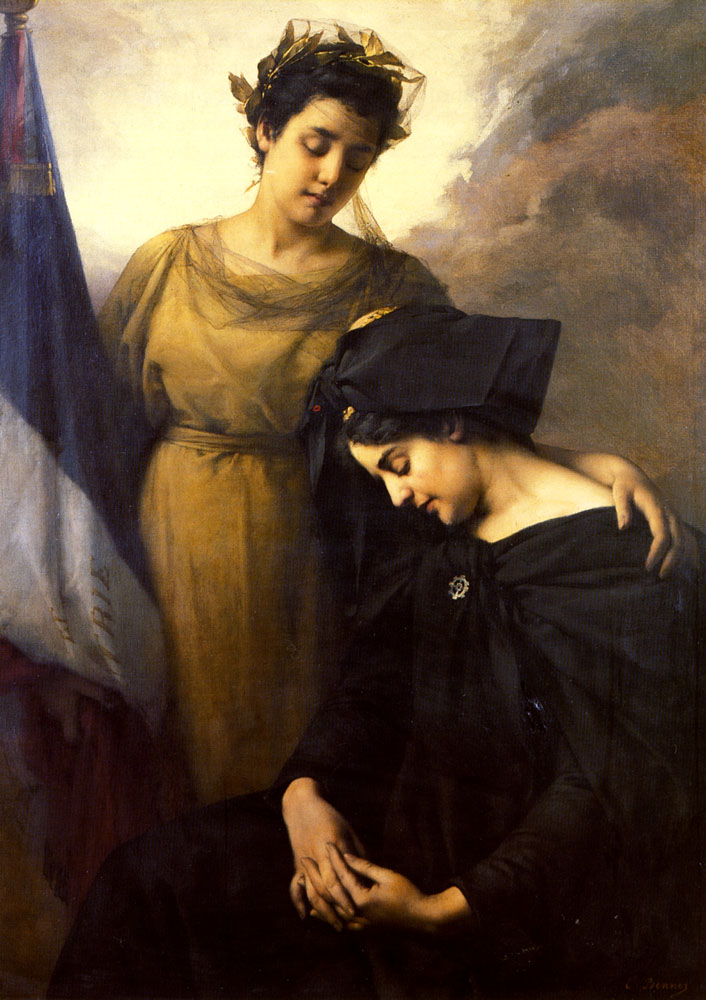
The Loss of Alsace–Lorraine (1895, private collection)

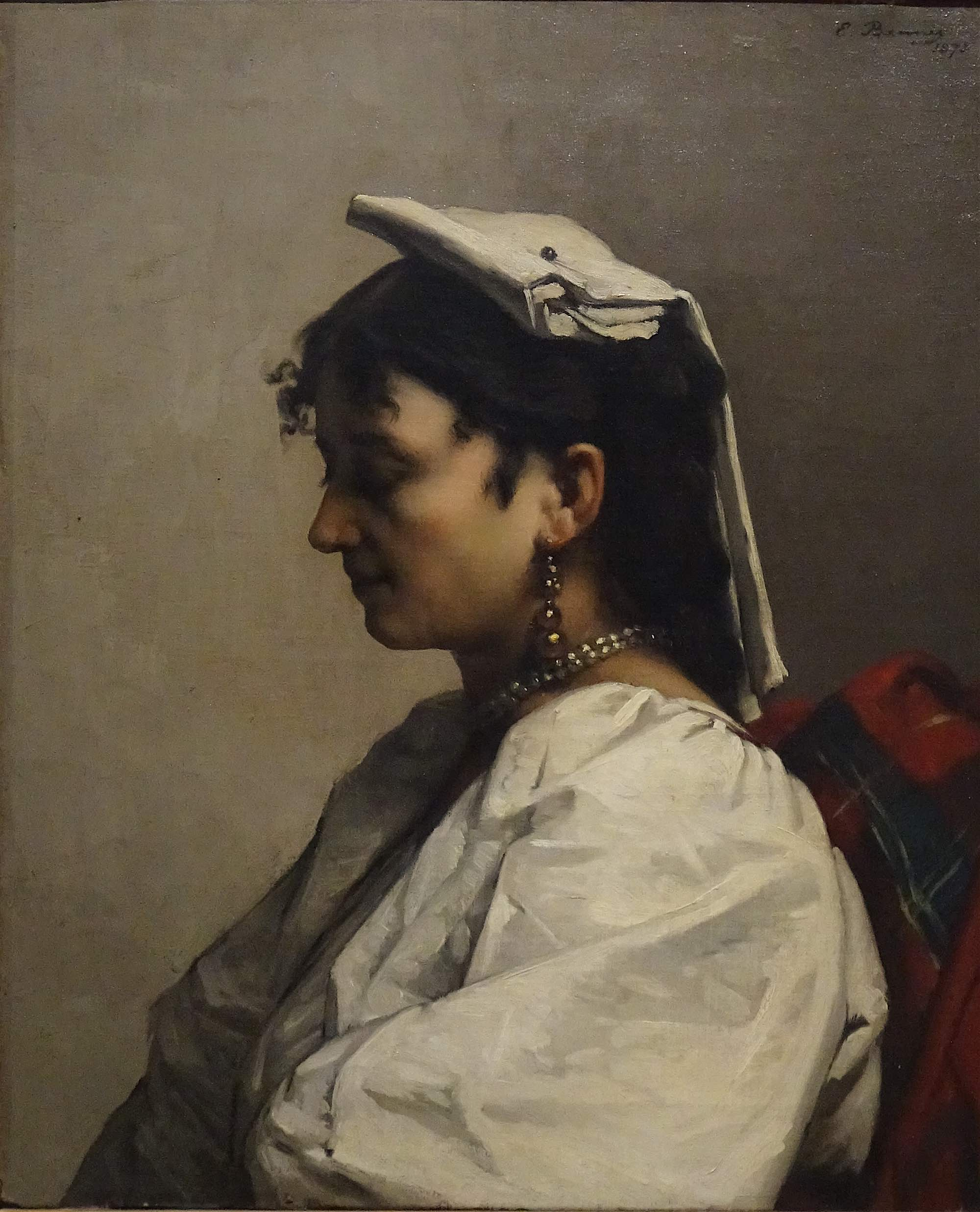
Young Woman in a Costume from Capri (undated, Musée des Beaux-Arts de Mulhouse)

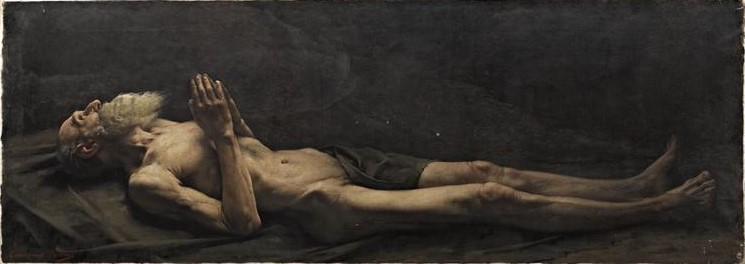
Saint Jerome (undated, Musée d'Orsay)

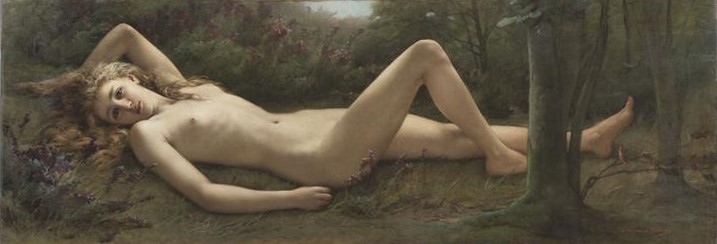
Young Girl on a Bed of Heather (undated, Château de Nemours)
