= Charles Harriott Smith =

English architect and architectural sculptor

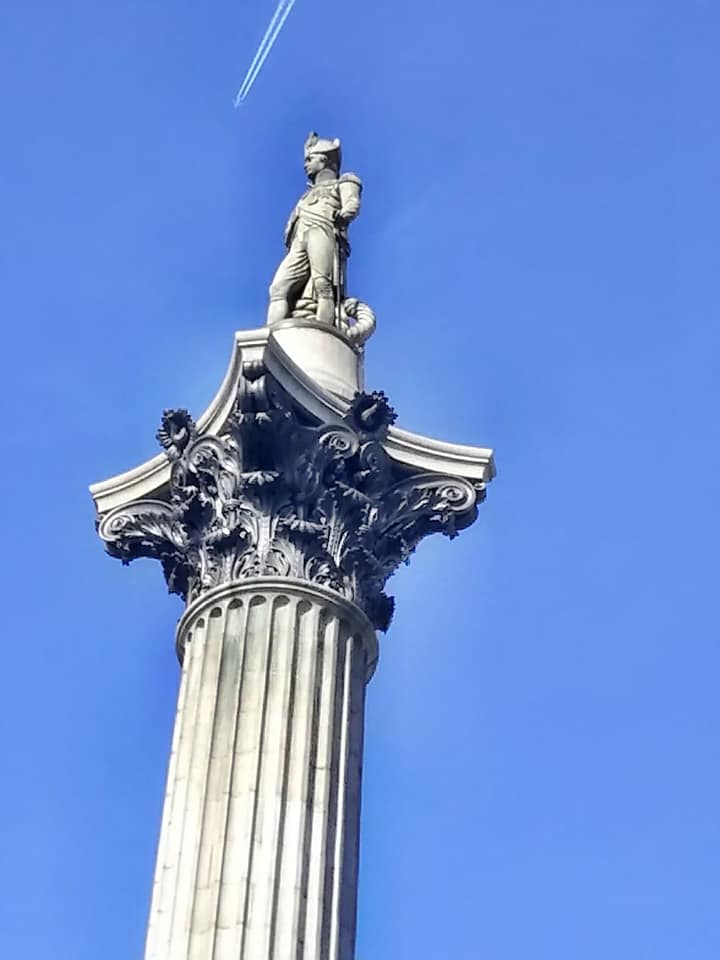
The capital of Nelson's Column

Charles Harriott Smith (1792–1864) was an English architect and architectural sculptor involved in several prestigious projects, ranging from the National Gallery to the Houses of Parliament. His iconic works include the capital of Nelson's Column supporting the statue by Edward Hodges Baily.

His work was influenced by Johann Joachim Winckelmann and architectural work was largely in the Neo-Hellenic style. Despite his undisputed contribution to London's architecture he tends to be a little-known figure.

== Life ==
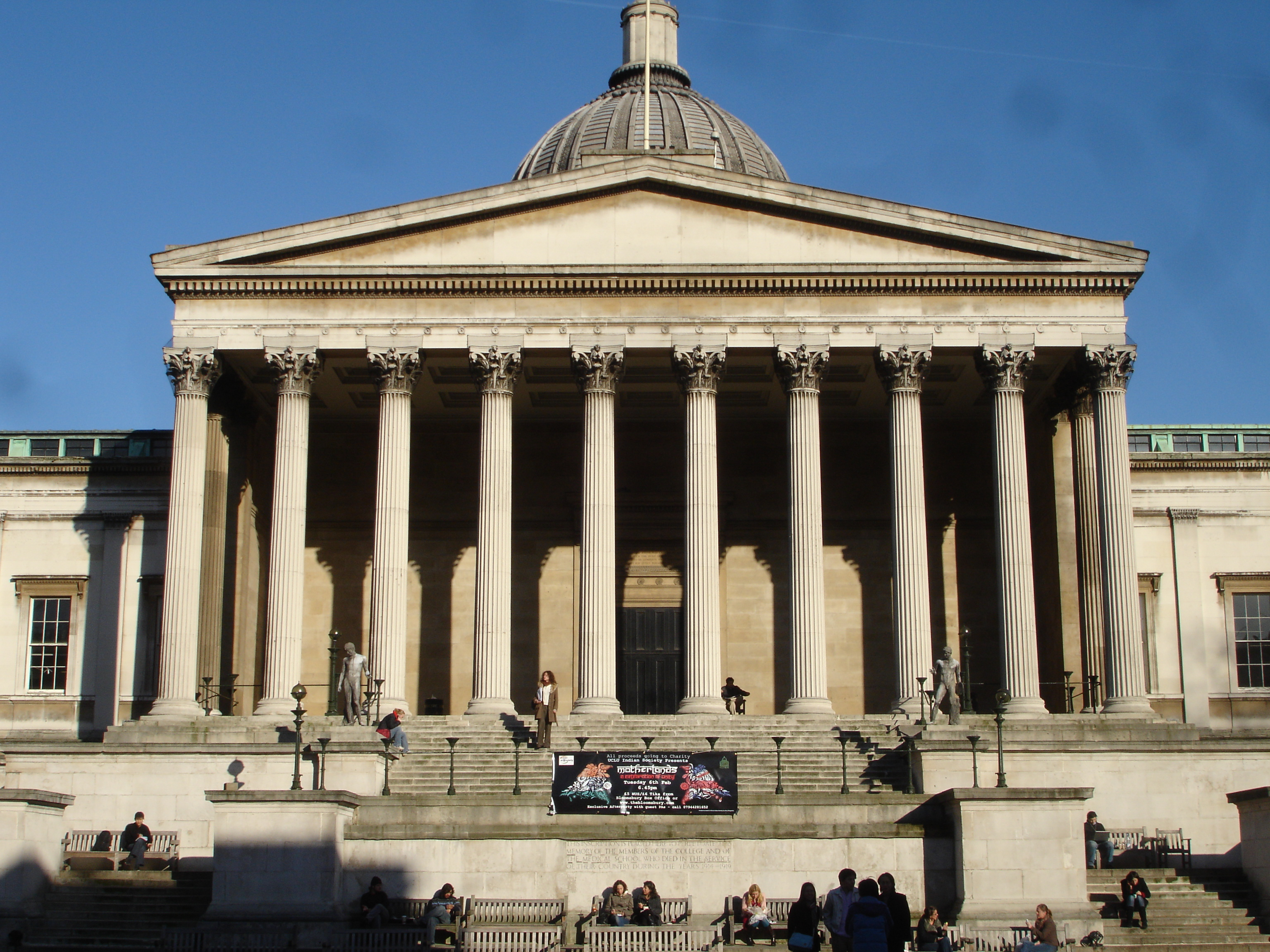
Portico of University College London

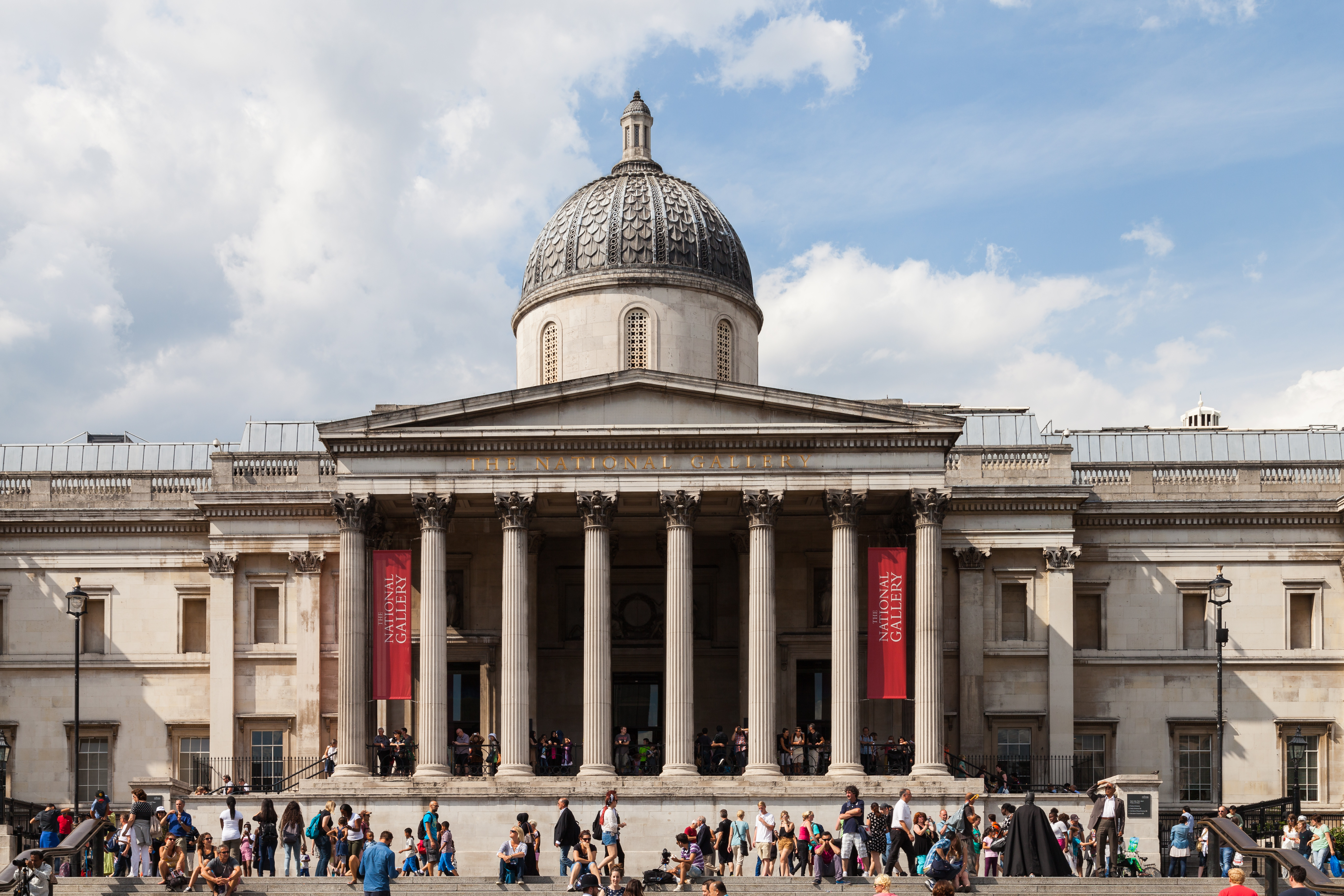
Portico of National Gallery

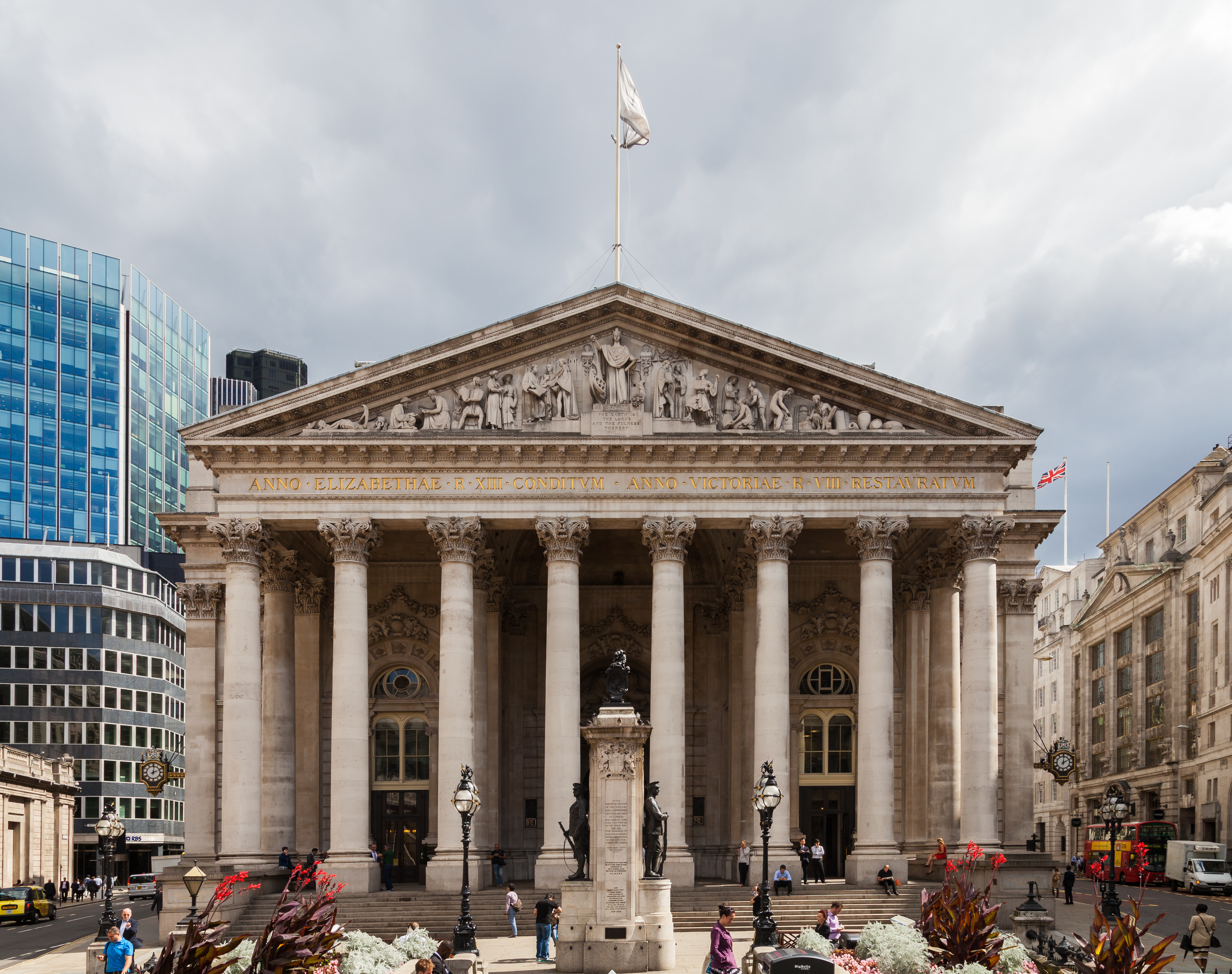
Portico of Royal Exchange

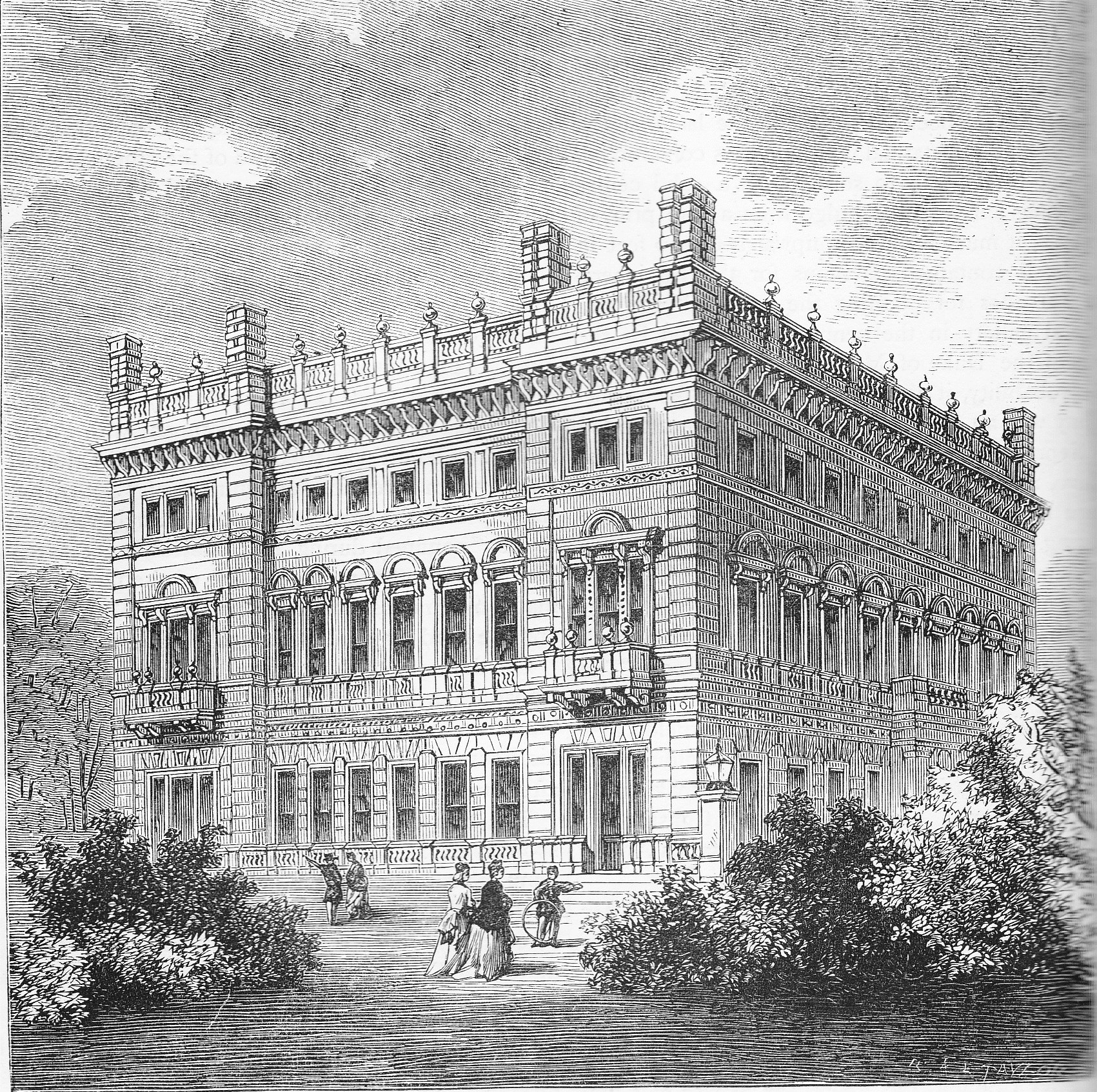
Bridgewater House

He was born in London on 1 February 1792, the son of Joseph Smith, a monumental sculptor with premises at 5 Portland Road near Regents Park. Charles left school in 1804 to start an apprenticeship in his father's yard. During his time there he met and befriended Joseph Bonomi (who presumably used the stone yard for supplies or for sculpture). Bonomi encouraged Charles to join the Royal Academy School in 1814. There he won the Gold Medal for Architecture in 1817. He exhibited at the Royal Academy from 1809 to 1823.

He studied geology, mineralogy and chemistry and was an expert on stone in a manner which greatly benefited the durability of his work. Due to this expertise, Sir Charles Barry consulted him on the project to rebuild the Houses of Parliament to choose stone most likely to survive the centuries. Smith and Barry formed part of the Royal Commission charged with sourcing sufficient building stone of the same type and quality to befit this huge project. This involved a tour of British quarries and of some of the better preserved abbeys and cathedrals of the country. They (and the two other geologists on the Commission: Henry de la Beche and William Smith) ultimately chose a Yorkshire Magnesian Limestone from a large quarry at Anston.

There is reference to his also being involved with hothouse design.

From 1851 he lived at 29 Clipstone Street, Fitzroy Square in London. In 1855 he was elected a member of the Royal Institute of British Architects.

He died at 24 Hatton Garden in London, where he had lived since 1861, on 27 October 1864. He is buried on the western side of Highgate Cemetery. His grave is no longer marked and has a large tree growing directly over it.

== Principal works ==
- Corinthian columns and architectural detail for portico at University College, London (1826)
- Portico, National Gallery, London (1823)
- Portico, Royal Exchange, London (1837)
- Bridgewater House, Westminster (1848) for Sir Charles Barry
- Dorchester House (1852) demolished 1929
- The capital of Nelson's Column (1850)
- Chapel at City of London Cemetery (1853)
- Museum of Practical Geology, Jermyn Street (1845)

== Funerary work ==
- Obelisk to William Staveley, Kensal Green Cemetery (1837)
- Tomb of Edward Scriven, Kensal Green Cemetery (1842)
- Grave of A R Freebairn (1847) Highgate Cemetery
- Grave of Jonathan Pereira (1853) Kensal Green Cemetery

== Other works ==
- Bust of Rev Edward J Turnour of Hambledon, Hampshire
- "Farnese Hercules" at the Geological Museum
- Monument to Giles Earle (1811) at Hendon, Middlesex
- Monument to Nathaniel Crichton (1814) at Hendon, Middlesex
- Monument to Robert Cotton (1821) at Reigate in Surrey
- Lt Col Fitzgerald (1821) St Marylebone Parish Church
- Rebecca Phipps (1830) St Marylebone Parish Church
- Henry Moreton Dyer (1841) St Marylebone Parish Church
- Countess Beauchamp (1846) St Marylebone Parish Church
- Elizabeth Peters (1822) in Badby
- John Francis (1824) in Badby
- Lt General George Deare (1823) St John's Wood Chapel
- Charles Higginson (1824) in Madras Cathedral
- Margaret Randall (1824) at Erith in Kent
- Monument to the Stuckey family (1824) in Langport, Somerset
- Rev Charles Tower (1825) at South Weald in Essex
- William Sleigh (1825) at Stockton, Durham
- Georgina Chamier (1826) at Stoke-next-Guildford in Surrey
- Anthony Parker (1827) at Churchgate Street in Essex
- Rev Edward Meyrick (1839) at Ramsbury
- Richard Alsager (1841) at Tooting
- Rev Francis Goode (1842) in Clapham Parish Church
- John Garden (1855) at Ringsfield in Suffolk
- Henry Hickman (1855) at Newnham, Hampshire

== Publications by Smith ==
- Lithology or Observations on Stones used for Buildings (1842)

== Family ==
He married as his second wife, Fanny Riviere, daughter of Daniel Riviere, both distinguished miniaturists. Their children included:

- William Riviere Smith (1806–1876) an artist
- Henry Parsons Riviere Smith (1811–1888) a watercolorist
- Robert Riviere Smith (1808–1882) a book-binder
- Percy Gordon Smith, architect
