= Stacpoole =

Stacpoole is a surname. Notable people with the surname include:

- Frederick Stacpoole (1813–1907), English engraver
- Henry De Vere Stacpoole (1863–1951), Irish author
- Richard Fitzgeorge de Stacpoole, 1st Duke de Stacpoole (1787–1848), Anglo-French Catholic aristocrat
- William Stacpoole (1830–1879), Irish nationalist politician
