= Daniel Riviere =

English miniaturist

Daniel Valentine Riviere (1780 – 17 February 1854) was an English miniaturist. He was the patriarch of the colourful London Riviere family of artists and singers.

== Life ==
He was born in London in 1780 the son of Samuel Newton Riviere and his wife Ann Garford. His father was of Huguenot descent.

Having trained at the Royal Academy Schools from 1796, he later exhibited at the Royal Academy from 1823 to 1840. Riviere was a drawing master in at least one school and also worked making miniature portraits (a fashion of the time), and also appears to have maintained an income from teaching art and singing.

He lived and died in the Marylebone district, dying on 17 February 1854.

== Family ==
On 18 December 1800 at Westminster he married Henrietta Thunder (1781-1849) and had ten children.

His daughter Fanny Riviere (also an artist) married the eminent sculptor Charles Harriott Smith.

He was father of William Riviere and Robert Riviere and grandfather of Briton Riviere.

His daughter Anna (1810-1884) was a noted opera singer who married Henry Rowley Bishop and ran off with her lover Nicolas-Charles Bochsa.

Henry Parsons Riviere was an artist and art teacher.

== Known works ==
- Maria I, Queen of Portugal
