= Henry Parsons Riviere =

English watercolour painter

- Born: 16 August 1811; London, England
- Died: 9 May 1888 (aged 76); London, England
- Occupation: Watercolour painter

Henry Parsons Riviere (16 August 1811 – 9 May 1888) was an English watercolour painter.

== Biography ==
Riviere was the son of Daniel Valentine Riviere, a drawing-master. Henry was the younger brother of William Riviere, and of Robert Riviere. He was born in the parish of St. Marylebone, London, on 16 August 1811. He became a student of the Royal Academy, and also painted rustic figures from life at the Artists' Society in Clipstone Street. His earliest exhibited drawings were "An Interior" and a copy of "The Triumph of Silenus," by Peter Paul Rubens, which appeared at the Society of British Artists in 1832. Two years later, in 1834, he was elected a member of the New Society of Painters in Water-Colours, where he exhibited 101 drawings before his retirement from it in 1850. In 1852 he became an associate of the older Society of Painters in Water-Colours, but he never rose to the rank of a full member. Subjects of Irish life and humour, such as "A Bit of Blarney," "A Little Botheration," and "Don't say Nay, charming Judy Callaghan," formed the staple of his exhibited works until 1865. About that time he gave up his practice as a teacher, and went to Rome, where he remained until near the end of his life. Henceforward the drawings which he sent home for exhibition consisted chiefly of views of the ancient ruins in Rome and its environs. Between 1852 and 1888 he contributed 299 works to the exhibitions of the society. He exhibited also occasionally between 1832 and 1873 at the Royal Academy, British Institution, and Society of British Artists. Among his more important works may be named "The Dying Brigand" and "The Forum," 1867, and "The Coliseum," 1868. He was an able copyist of the old masters. Titian's "Entombment" and Paul Veronese's "Marriage at Cana," both in water-colours, are in the possession of Mr. Briton Riviere, R.A. The South Kensington Museum has "A Temple, formerly known as a Temple of Vesta, and the House of Rienzi, Rome," painted by him in 1887.

Riviere returned finally to England in 1884, and died at 26 St. John's Wood Road, London, on 9 May 1888.
