= An Anxious Moment =

Painting by Briton Riviere

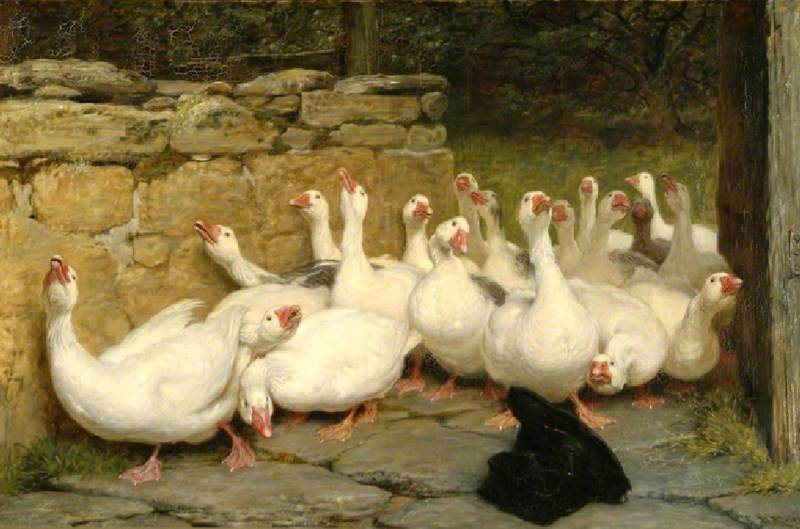
- Artist: Briton Rivière
- Year: 1878
- Type: Oil on canvas, genre painting
- Dimensions: 66 cm × 101.5 cm (26 in × 40.0 in)
- Location: Royal Holloway, Surrey

An Anxious Moment is an oil painting on canvas by the British artist Briton Rivière, from 1878.

== History and description ==
It features a gaggle of geese in rural England, the tension rising as they halt for an anxious moment when they encounter an unexpected object blocking their path, only to realise it is just a discarded hat. The image was a popular one and was referenced in parodies several times over the coming years. John Ruskin praised it in one of his lectures, comparing it favourably with Edwin Landseer's attempt to depict birds. It was displayed at the Royal Academy Exhibition of 1878 held at Burlington House in London. It was acquired by the philanthropist Thomas Holloway, who donated it to Royal Holloway in 1883.

== Bibliography ==
- Bills, Mark. Art in the Age of Queen Victoria: A Wealth of Depictions. Russell-Cotes Art Gallery and Museum, 2001.
- Chapel, Jeannie. Victorian Taste: The Complete Catalogue of Paintings at the Royal Holloway College. A. Zwemmer, 1982
