= Jonathan Pereira =

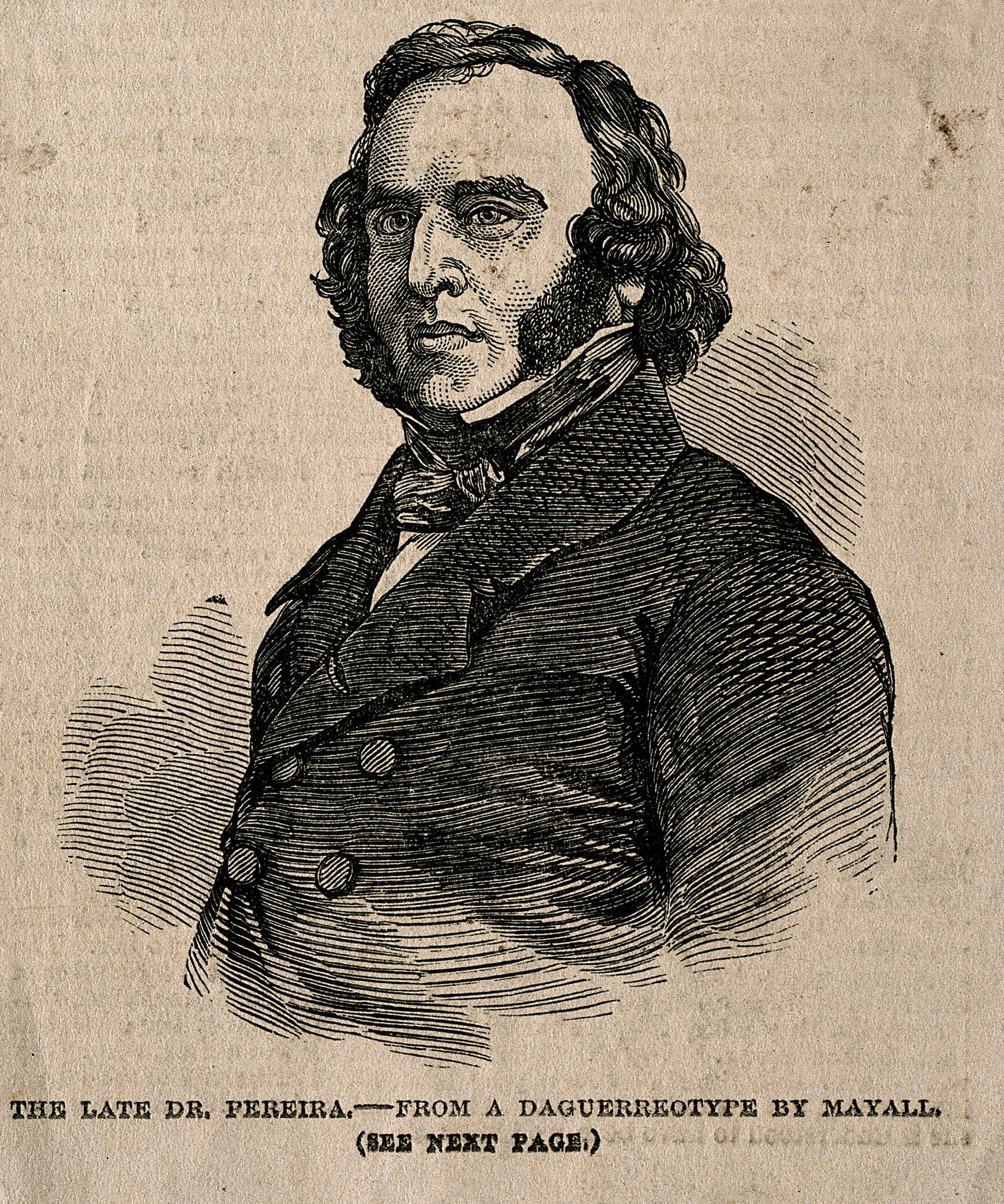
Prof Dr Jonathan Pereira

Jonathan Pereira FRS (22 May 1804, in London – 20 January 1853) was a pharmacologist, author of the Elements of Materia Medica, a standard work. He was examiner on the subject in the University of London.

== Life ==
Pereira graduated as apothecary in 1823 after studying at the Aldersgate General Dispensary and St Bartholomew's Hospital. In 1826 he became lecturer on chemistry at the Royal College of Surgeons and in 1832 he was an established physician in London, being appointed professor of materia medica and lecturer in chemistry at the Aldersgate Medical School. In 1839 he became professor and lecturer at the London Hospital, where he received the position of assistant physician in 1841. Jonathan Pereira delivered the introductory lectures on Materia Medica in 1842 at the Pharmaceutical Society and one year later he was appointed as Professor of Materia Medica by this institution, examining the subject in the School of Pharmacy of the University of London.

His subject area was the forerunner of pharmacology and he published a series of research papers on plant drugs. Pereira later resigned in 1852, the result of a dispute between the Council of the Pharmaceutical Society following the illegal publications of his lecture material. After this incident another teacher in materia medica was not appointed, instead Robert Bentley, who was a professor of botany at the time, was asked to combine the lectures with his botany lectures.

== Pereira's Materia Medica ==
He developed an interest in crude drugs, an area that was then poorly understood in Britain. After years of research he acquired an extensive knowledge of the history of origin, morphology and histology of crude drugs where he was later appointed professor of materia medica at the London Hospital. His work on Materia Medica was among the earliest major English contributions to pharmacology and helped place the study of drugs on a more scientific basis.

During one of his first lectures held at the School of Pharmacy he spoke about ‘material medica consisting of three parts: (1) pharmacognosy, pharmacology, pharmacopathia or the history of simple drugs; (2) pharmacy, and (3) pharmacodynamics. It was here that he referred to the study of crude drugs under the name pharmacognosy instead of materia medica in what appeared to be the first time in which it was used, when in fact it was introduced by Seydler in 1817. It took many years until the term was officially used as the name of the subject taught to pharmacy students. Students of Pharmacy studying for their major examinations were given the opportunity of examining the drugs further as well as being introduced to the microscope as another method for the examination of drugs in their powdered form such as starch, with the exception of vegetable drugs. Although where not being examined on authenticity and quality, Pereira encouraged his students to investigate authenticity and quality of drugs, something that he was carrying out a lot of research on at the time. This was considered an important part ofon 20 the pharmacists role as Jacob Bell pointed out ‘the reputation of pharmacy depended upon pharmacists having this expertise.

Pereira was named a Fellow of the Royal Society in May 1838. Two years later he received the degree of M.D. "honoris causa" from Erlangen University. In his memory a marble bust was erected in the London Hospital and the Pharmaceutical Society founded the Pereira Medal and a scholarship fund with his name.

== Death and Grave ==
He died on 20 January 1853 and was buried in Kensal Green Cemetery. His monument was designed and created by Charles Harriott Smith.

== Works ==
- 1838: Vorlesungen über Materia medica, oder über die Herkunft, die Qualität, die Zusammensetzung und die Wirksamkeit der Arzneistoffe, geh. 1835-1836 in der Aldergate's Schule zu London . Vol. 2 . Kollmenn, Leipzig 1838 Digital edition by the University and State Library Düsseldorf
- 1843: The Elements of Materia Medica and Therapeutics : in 2 Vol. - Philadelphia : Lea & Blanchard, Digital edition by the University and State Library Düsseldorf
  - 4. ed., enl. and impr. including notices of most of the medicinal substances in use in the civilised world and forming an encyclopaedia of Materia Medica: Vol. 1-2.2 - London : Longman [u.a.], 1854-1857. Digital edition by the University and State Library Düsseldorf
- 1854: Lectures on Polarized Light, 2nd edition, Baden Powell editor, via HathiTrust
