= Henry Bishop (composer) =

English composer (1787–1856)

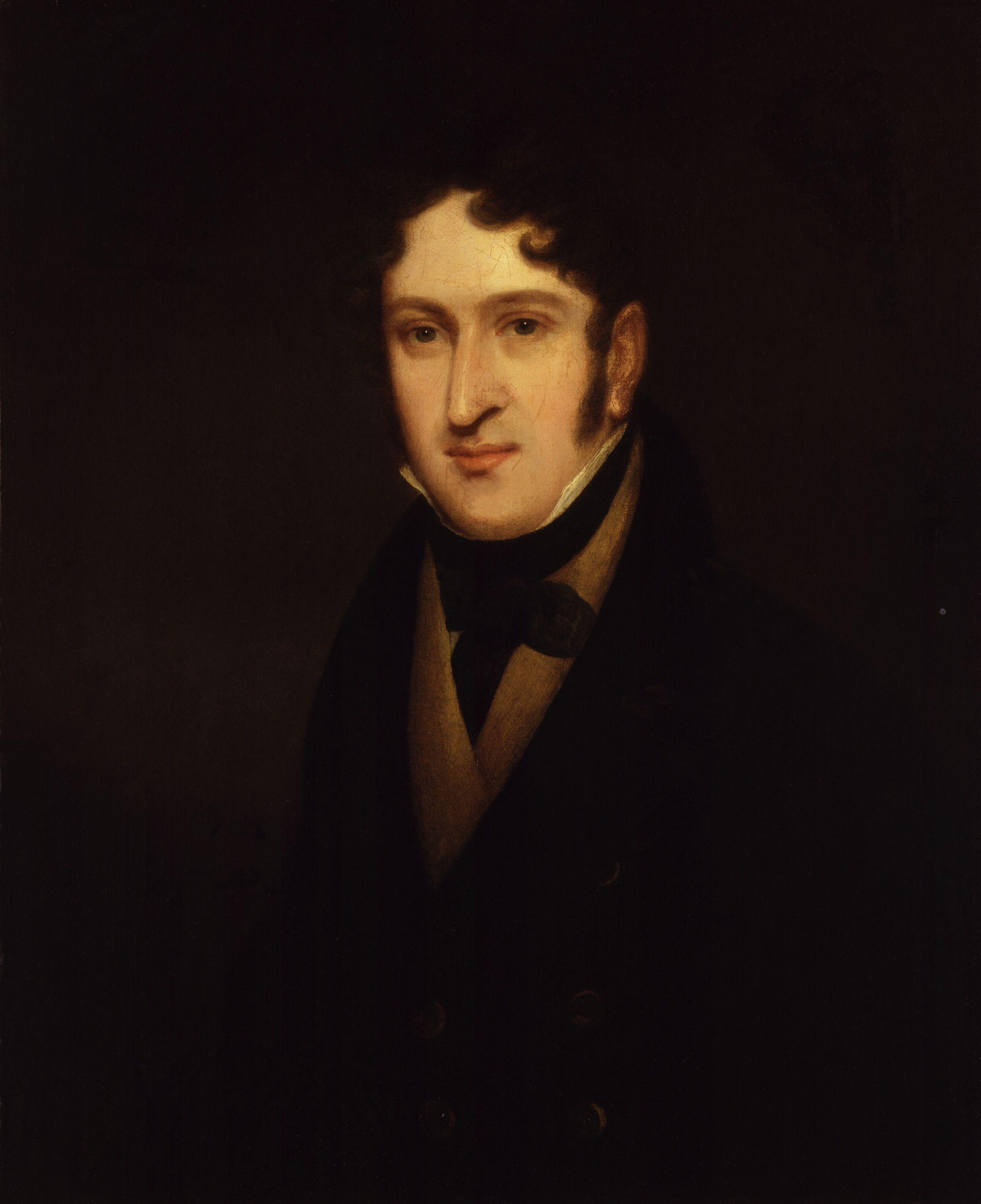
Sir Henry Rowley Bishop, by Isaac Pocock

Sir Henry Rowley Bishop (18 November 1787 – 30 April 1856) was an English composer from the late Classical and early Romantic eras. He is most famous for the songs "Home! Sweet Home!" and "Lo! Hear the Gentle Lark." He was the composer or arranger of some 120 dramatic works, including 80 operas, light operas, cantatas, and ballets. Bishop was Knighted in 1842. Bishop worked for all the major theatres of London in his era – including the Royal Opera House at Covent Garden, the Theatre Royal, Drury Lane, Vauxhall Gardens and the Haymarket Theatre, and was Professor of Music at the universities of Edinburgh and Oxford. His second wife was the noted soprano Anna Bishop, who scandalised British society by leaving him and conducting an open liaison with the harpist Nicolas-Charles Bochsa until the latter's death in Sydney.

== Life ==
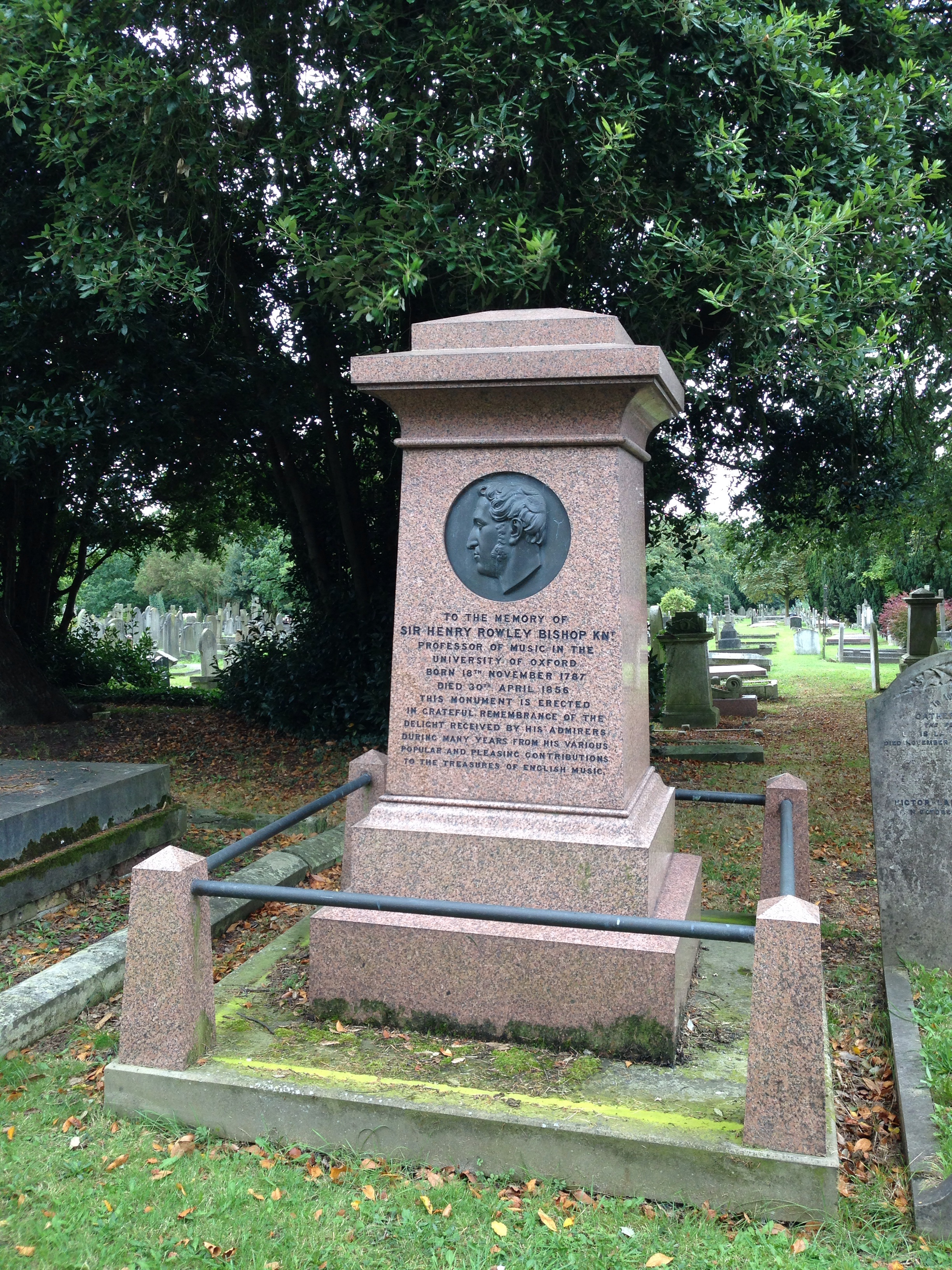
Bishop's grave at East Finchley Cemetery

Bishop was born in London, where his father was a watchmaker and haberdasher. At the age of 13, Bishop left full-time education and worked as a music-publisher with his cousin. His first big moment of inspiration was when he went to see a concert of Joseph Haydn at the Hanover Square Rooms in 1794 at age 8. After training as a jockey at Newmarket, he took some lessons in harmony from Francesco Bianchi in London. In 1804 he wrote the music to a piece called "Angelina", which was performed at Margate.

He wrote the music for a ballet, Tamerlan et Bajazet, which opened in 1806 at the King's Theatre, Haymarket and led to a permanent post. His first opera, The Circassian Bride, was performed at the Theatre Royal, Drury Lane on 23 February 1809, but on the following night the theatre burned down, forcing him to re-write the score from memory. The prima donna of that production, a Miss Lyons, became Bishop's first wife.

After his second success on the stage with The Maniac (1810), Bishop became music director of Covent Garden for the next 14 years. In 1813, he was a founding member of the Royal Philharmonic Society. In 1825 Bishop was induced by Robert Elliston to transfer his services from Covent Garden to the rival house in Drury Lane, for which he wrote, among others, the opera Aladdin, based on the story from 1001 Nights. It was intended to compete with Weber's Oberon, commissioned by the other house. Aladdin failed, and Bishop's career as an operatic composer came to an end. He did, however, rework operas by other composers. An 1827 Covent Garden playbill records a performance of the Marriage of Figaro with "The Overture and Music selected chiefly from Mozart’s operas – the new music by Mr Bishop". It included an aria called Follow, follow o'er the mountain, sung by Miss Paton.

In 1841 he was appointed Reid Professor of Music in the University of Edinburgh, but resigned the office in 1843. In 1848 he became Heather Professor of Music at the University of Oxford, succeeding William Crotch, until 1853.

According to William Denslow, Bishop was a freemason. Bishop was knighted in 1842, the first composer ever to receive that honour.

Bishop's later years were clouded by scandal. He had married his second wife, the singer Ann Rivière, daughter of Daniel Riviere and sister of Robert Riviere, in 1831. She was twenty-three years younger than he, and they had three children. In 1839, Anna Bishop (as she was now known) abandoned her husband and three children to run off with her lover and accompanist, the harpist and composer Nicolas-Charles Bochsa. They left England to give concert tours abroad until Bochsa died in Sydney, Australia, in 1856. Anna Bishop sang on every continent and was the most widely travelled opera singer of the 19th century.

Sir Henry Bishop died in poverty in London, although he had a substantial income during his lifetime. He is buried in East Finchley Cemetery in north London. Bishop is commemorated on the south side of the Albert Memorial in Kensington Gardens by a relief sculpture on the Frieze of Parnassus, which depicts influential composers, architects, poets, painters, and sculptors; he is the only 19th century British composer represented.

== Music ==
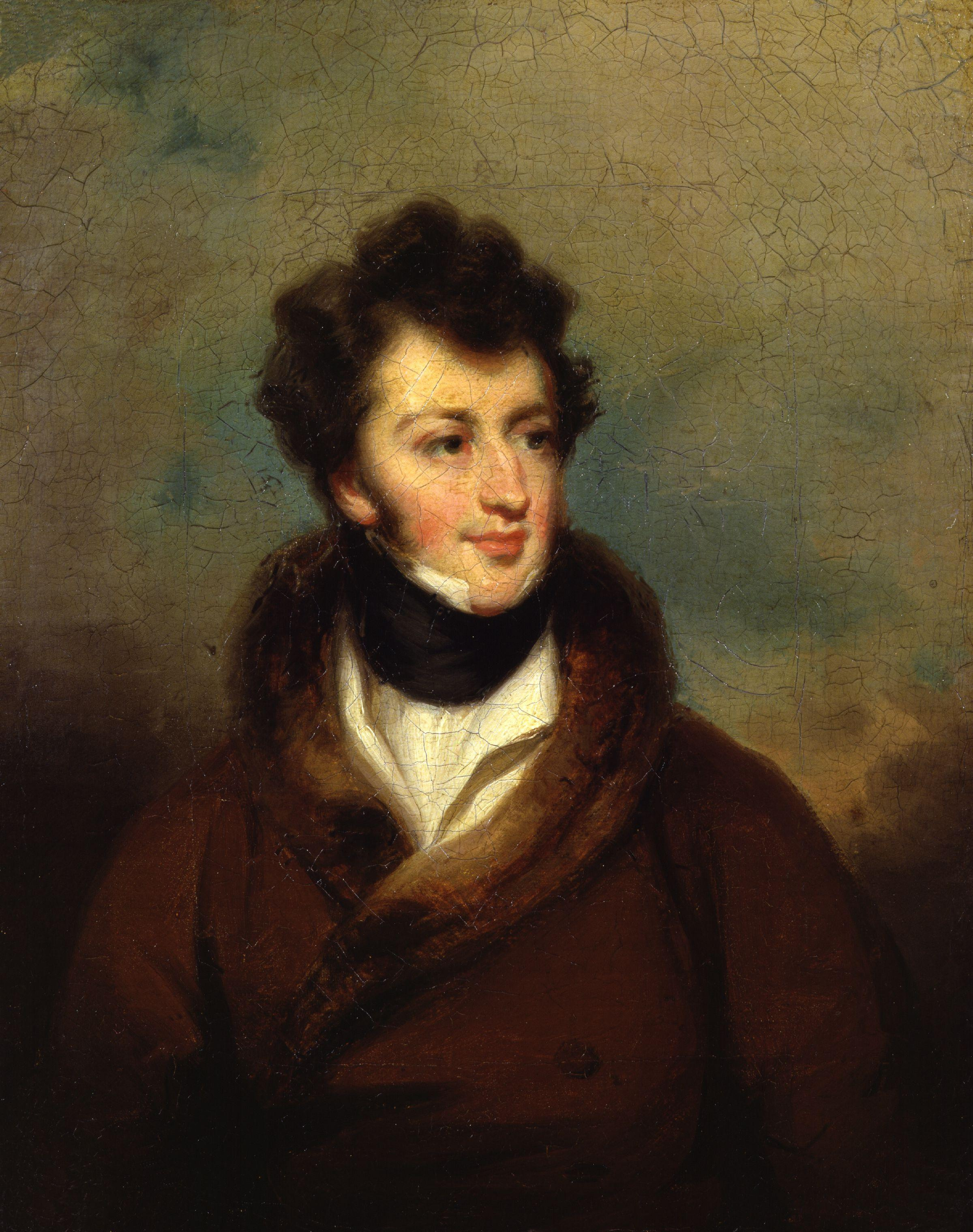
Sir Henry Rowley Bishop by George Henry Harlow (died 1819)

Heavily influenced by Mozart and Rossini, Bishop's "operas" were written in a style and format that satisfied the audiences of his day. They have more in common with the earlier, native English ballad opera genre, or with modern musicals, than the classical opera of continental Europe with full recitatives. His first opera, The Circassian's Bride (1809), had one performance at Drury Lane before the theatre burned down and the score was lost. Bishop reconstructed it from memory.

Between 1816 and 1828, Bishop composed the music for a series of Shakespearean operas staged by Frederic Reynolds. But these, and the numerous works, operas, burlettas, cantatas, incidental music etc. which he wrote are mostly forgotten. Even his limited partnerships with various composers – including Joseph Edwards Carpenter, Thomas Simpson Cooke and Stephen Glover – are often overlooked. The year 1816 also saw the composition of a string quartet in C minor.

His most successful operas were The Virgin of the Sun (1812), The Miller and his Men (1813), Guy Mannering (1816), and Clari, or the Maid of Milan (1823). Clari, with a libretto by the American John Howard Payne, included the song Home! Sweet Home!, which became enormously popular. In 1852 Bishop 'relaunched' the song as a parlour ballad. It was popular in the United States throughout the American Civil War and after.

According to music historian Anne Gilchrist:

'If a postscript by another hand may follow Mr. Frank Kidson's* most illuminating true story of the origin of Home, Sweet Home,' in the November number of THE CHOIR, musical readers may perhaps be interested to learn that the melody was vastly improved by compression in Sir Henry Bishop's later edition of it (the one now familiar). The original so-called 'Sicilian Air,' which Bishop - as Mr. Kidson has told - confessed to having written himself for lack of the required specimen of Sicilian melody, is a tedious affair, with much repetition. The first two bars (now counted as four) of the melody are sung, with the variation of a single note, four times, and after two bars of something a little different, a fifth time. It is as if one sang the strain, ‘ 'Mid pleasures and palaces though we may roam, Be it never so humble, there's no place like home,’ twice over, then two bars of variation, then the music of the above two lines once more. There is as yet no refrain of 'Home, sweet home,' but instead, the strain belonging to 'There's no place like home, there's no place like home' is sung (except for one note) twice over, as a conclusion. The truth as it appears to me is that Bishop's notion of Sicilian music was exclusively derived from the hymn-tune 'Sicilian Mariners,' whose character he imitated as closely as prudence would allow.'

Also of note is Bishop's 1819 musical comedy adaptation of William Shakespeare's The Comedy of Errors, which included the popular coloratura soprano aria "Lo! Here the Gentle Lark."

Bishop's last work was the commissioned music for the ode at the installation of Lord Derby as chancellor of the University of Oxford in 1853.

== Principal works ==
Home! Sweet Home!
A synthesized piano transcription

Foresters sound the cheerful horn
Performed by Atelier Vocal des Herbiers (petit ensemble Amarante)

Stage works

- The Maniac, or The Swiss Banditti (1810), opera
- The Brazen Bust (1813), melodrama
- The Miller and His Men (1813), melodrama
- Sadak and Kalasrade, or The Waters of Oblivion (1814), opera
- Brother and Sister (1815), entertainment
- Guy Mannering (1816), musical play
- December and May (1818), operetta
- The Heart of Mid-Lothian (1819), musical drama
- The Comedy of Errors (1819), musical comedy
- The Battle of Bothwell Brigg (1820), musical romance
- Henri Quatre, or, Paris in the olden time (1820), musical romance
- Clari, or the Maid of Milan (1823), opera
- As You Like It (1824), musical comedy
- Alladin (1826), opera
- Yelva, or The Orphan of Russia (1829), musical drama

Cantatas/Oratorios

- The Jolly Beggars (Robert Burns) (1817), cantata
- Waterloo (1826), cantata
- The Seventh Day (John Milton) (1833), sacred cantata
- The Departure from Paradise (Milton) (1836), sacred cantata
- The Fallen Angel (1839), oratorio

Instrumental music

- Grand Sinfonia in C major (1805) for orchestra
- Concertante (1807) for flute, oboe, bassoon, violin and double bass
- String Quartet in C minor (1816)
- Overture (alla Irlandese) (1823) for piano
- A Lament (1829) for piano
