= Requiescat (painting) =

Painting by Briton Rivière

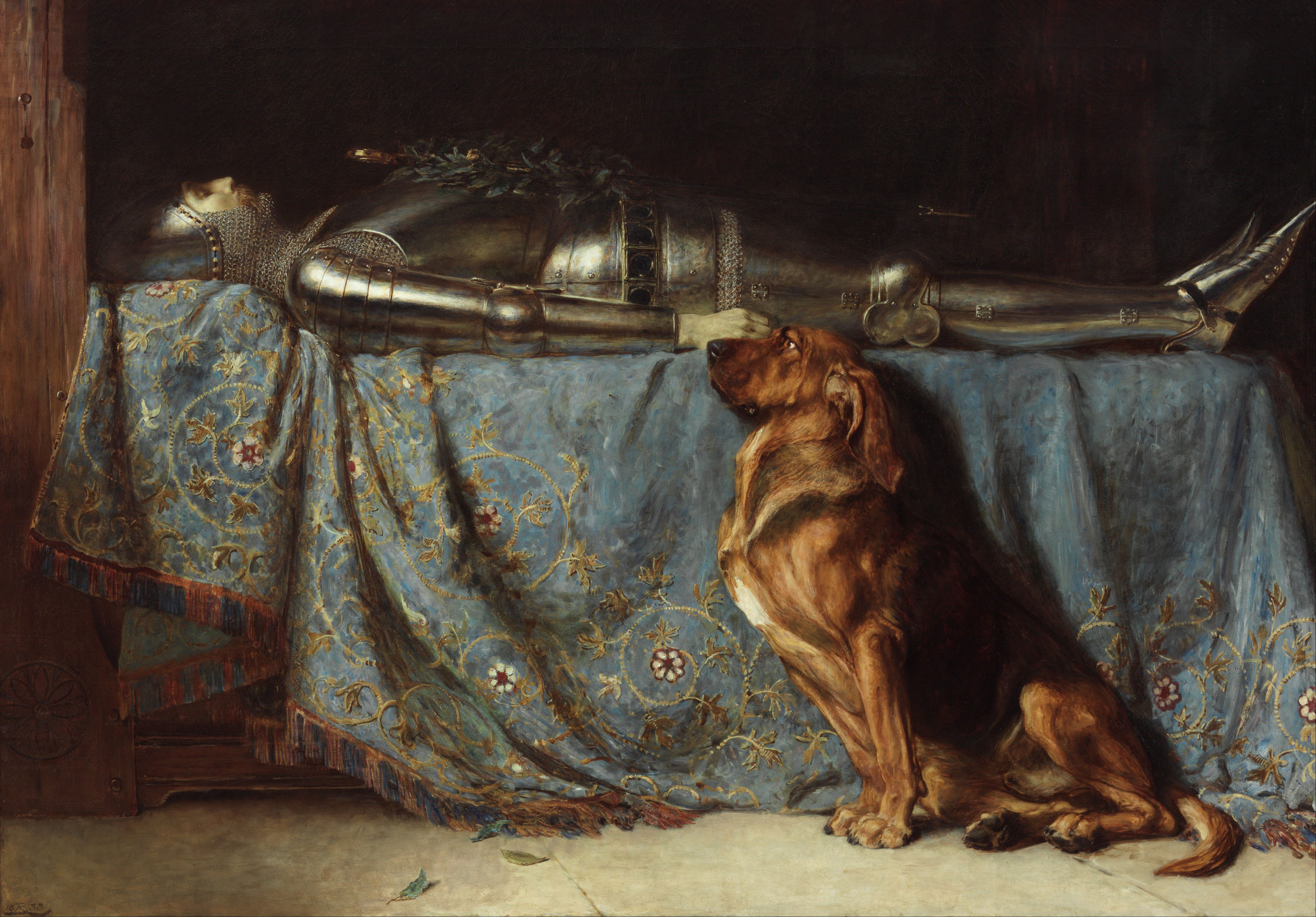
- Artist: Briton Rivière
- Year: 1888
- Medium: Oil on canvas
- Dimensions: 158.7 cm × 225.0 cm (62.5 in × 88.6 in)
- Location: Art Gallery of New South Wales, Sydney

Requiescat is an oil on canvas painting by British artist Briton Rivière, from 1888. It is held at the Art Gallery of New South Wales, in Sydney.

The painting depicts an armoured medieval knight lying atop a bed with a blue floral sheet. A dog (often identified as a bloodhound) sits besides the bed while observantly looking towards the face of the knight on whom a wreath is placed, indicating death.

The dog's expression is potentially explained by the title of the painting, Requiescat, meaning "a prayer for the repose of a dead person" as the dog keeps vigil over his late owner.

== Exhibitions ==
- Royal Academy of Arts, London, 1888–1888
- World's Columbian Exposition, Jackson Park, Chicago, 1 May 1893–30 Oct 1893
- Tasmanian International Exhibition, Hobart, exhibition venue unknown, 15 Nov 1894–15 May 1895
- Internationale Kunst-Ausstellung, Berlin, exhibition venue unknown, 1896–1896
- Grand Courts collection, Art Gallery of New South Wales, Sydney, Nov 2021–2023
