= Briton Rivière =

English painter

Briton Rivière RA
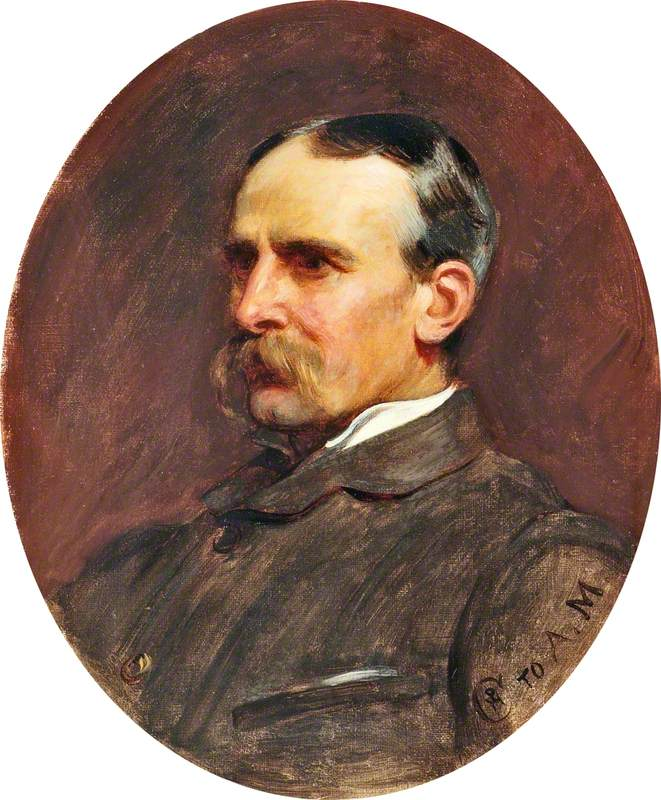
- 1881 portrait by Philip Hermogenes Calderon
- Born: 14 August 1840; London, England
- Died: 20 April 1920 (aged 79); London, England
- Known for: Paintings of animals

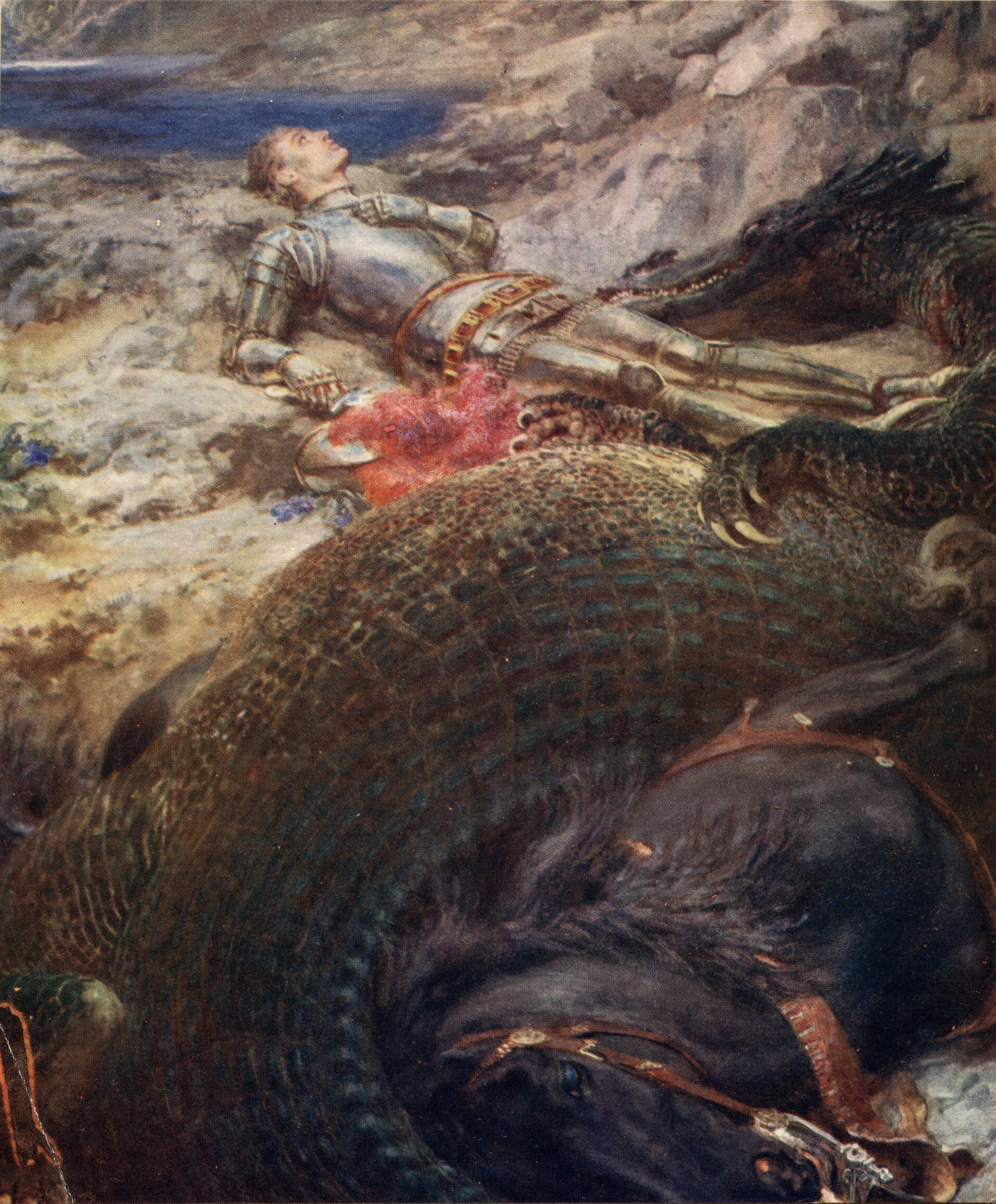
St. George and the Dragon – Rivière's depiction of an exhausted St. George lying down beside the slain dragon is a radical departure from the triumphant equestrian position in which this saint is traditionally depicted.

Briton Rivière RA (14 August 1840 – 20 April 1920) was a British artist of Huguenot descent. He exhibited a variety of paintings at the Royal Academy, but devoted much of his life to animal paintings.

== Biography ==
Briton's father, William Rivière (1806–1876), was for some years drawing-master at Cheltenham College, and then an art teacher at the University of Oxford. Briton was educated at Cheltenham College and Oxford, where he took his degree in 1867. For his art training he was indebted almost entirely to his father. His paternal uncle Henry Parsons Rivière (1811–1888) was also a noted watercolourist, exhibiting works at the Royal Watercolour Society, London and the Royal Birmingham Society of Artists.

His first pictures appeared at the British Institution, and in 1857 he exhibited three works at the Royal Academy, but it was not until 1863 that he became a regular contributor to the Academy exhibitions. In that year he was represented by The eve of the Spanish Armada, and in 1864 by a Romeo and Juliet. However, subjects of this kind did not attract him long, for in 1865 he began, with Sleeping Deerhound, a series of paintings of animal-subjects which occupied much of the rest of his life. In a lengthy interview in Chums Boys Annual, entitled "How I paint animals", Rivière explained some of the practicalities of painting both tame and wild animals:

I have always been a great lover of dogs but I have worked at them so much that I've grown tired of having them about me. However, you can never paint a dog unless you are fond of it. I never work from a dog without the assistance of a man who is well acquainted with animals ... Collies, I think, are the most restless dogs ...greyhounds are also very restless, and so are fox terriers ... The only way to paint wild animals is to gradually accumulate a large number of studies and a great knowledge of the animal itself, before you can paint its picture ... I paint from dead animals as well as from live ones. I have had the body of a fine lioness in my studio ... I have done a great deal of work in the dissecting rooms at the Zoological Gardens from time to time.

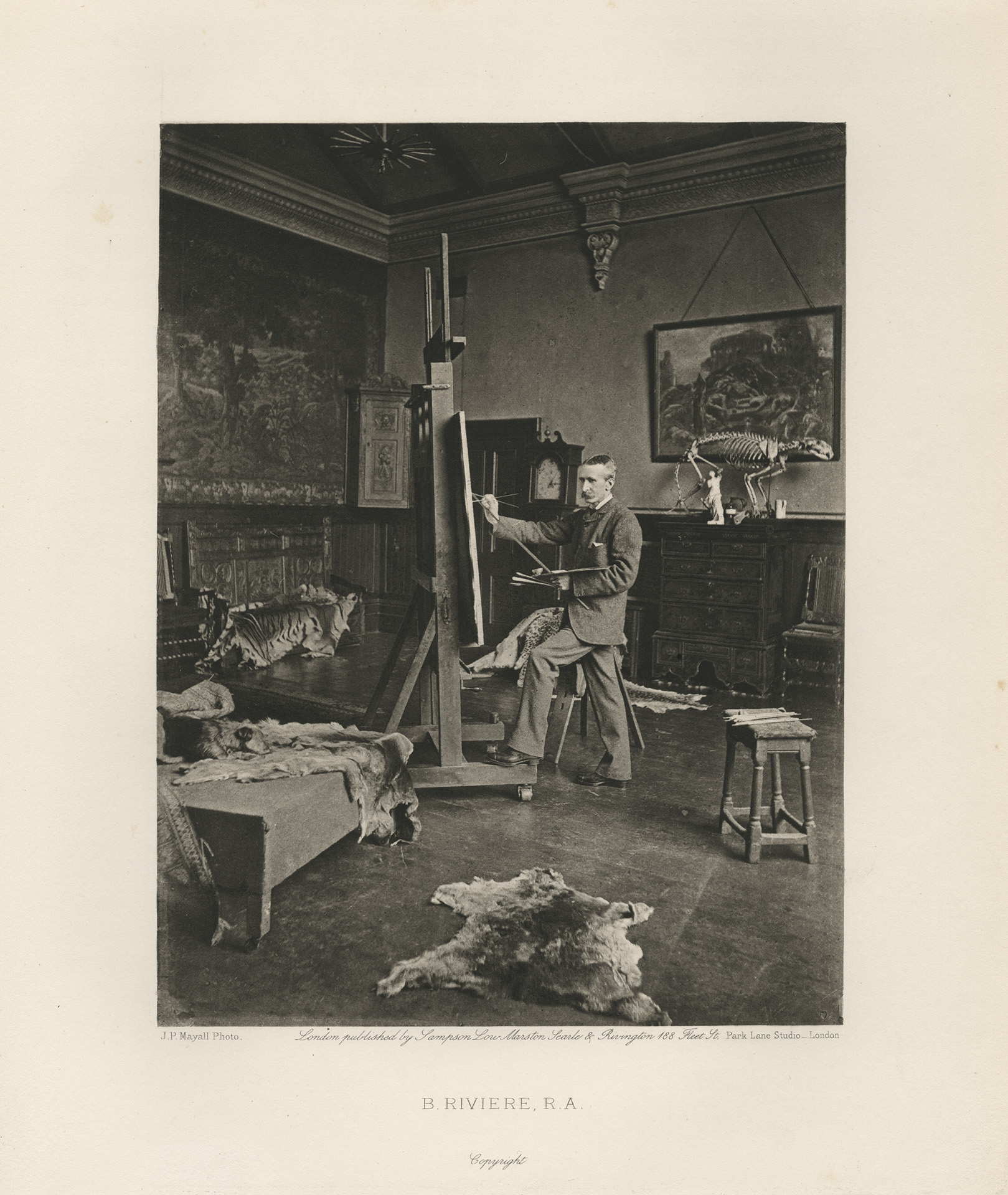
Rivière by J. P. Mayall from Artists at Home, published 1884, Department of Image Collections, National Gallery of Art Library, Washington, DC

Early in his career, Rivière made some mark as an illustrator, beginning with Punch. He was elected an Associate of the Royal Academy of Arts in 1878, and a Royal Academician in 1881, and received the degree of Doctor of Civil Law at Oxford in 1891. He was narrowly defeated in the election for President of the Royal Academy in 1896. His wife, Mary Alice Rivière (née Dobell; 1844–1931) whom he married in 1867, was a painter and exhibited briefly at the Royal Academy of Arts in 1869–70. After his death she presented the British Museum with four of his drawings (and an etching "The king drinks"), which complements the dozens of prints made after his work housed there, especially by Frederick Stacpoole and William Henry Simmons. The artist and his wife had seven children; five sons and two daughters. One of the sons, Hugh Goldwin Rivière (1869–1956), became a portraitist; another son (Evelyn) married the eminent psychoanalyst and translator of Sigmund Freud known as Joan Riviere.

== Works ==
Paintings by Rivière are held by public institutions including the Tate, Metropolitan Museum of Art, Royal Holloway, University of London and Chrysler Museum of Art.

These include:

- Argus (1873)
- War Time (1874; Chrysler Museum of Art, Norfolk, Virginia: 2011.9)
- Sympathy (c.1878)
- 'There's many a slip twixt the cup and the lip' (1881)
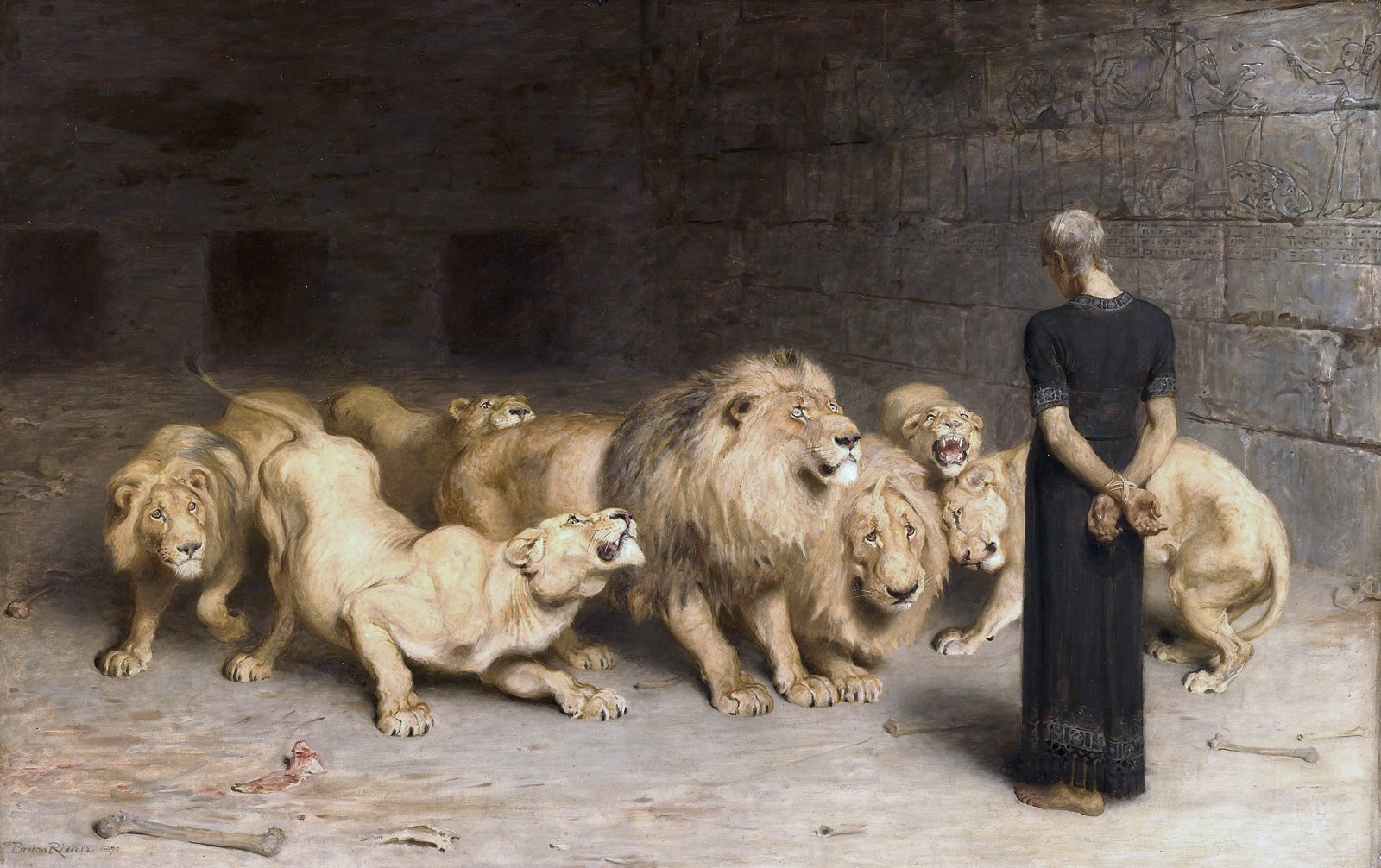
Daniel in the Lions' Den (1872; Walker Art Gallery)

War Time (1874; Chrysler Museum of Art)

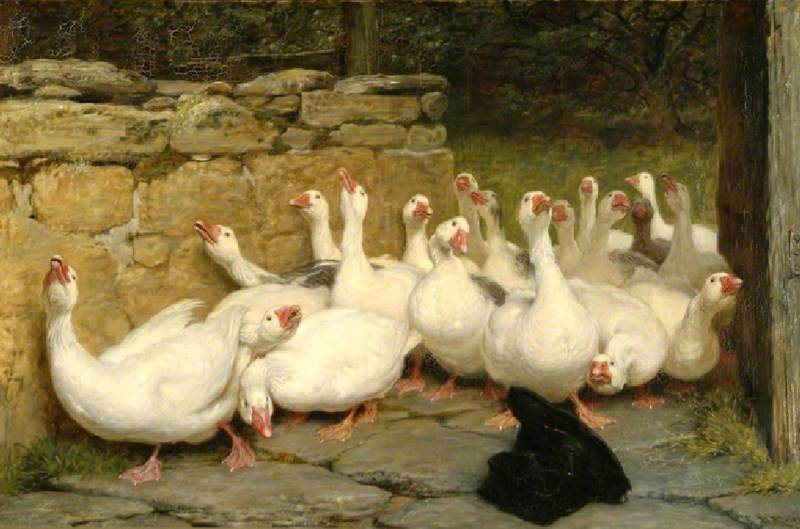
An Anxious Moment (1878, Royal Holloway)

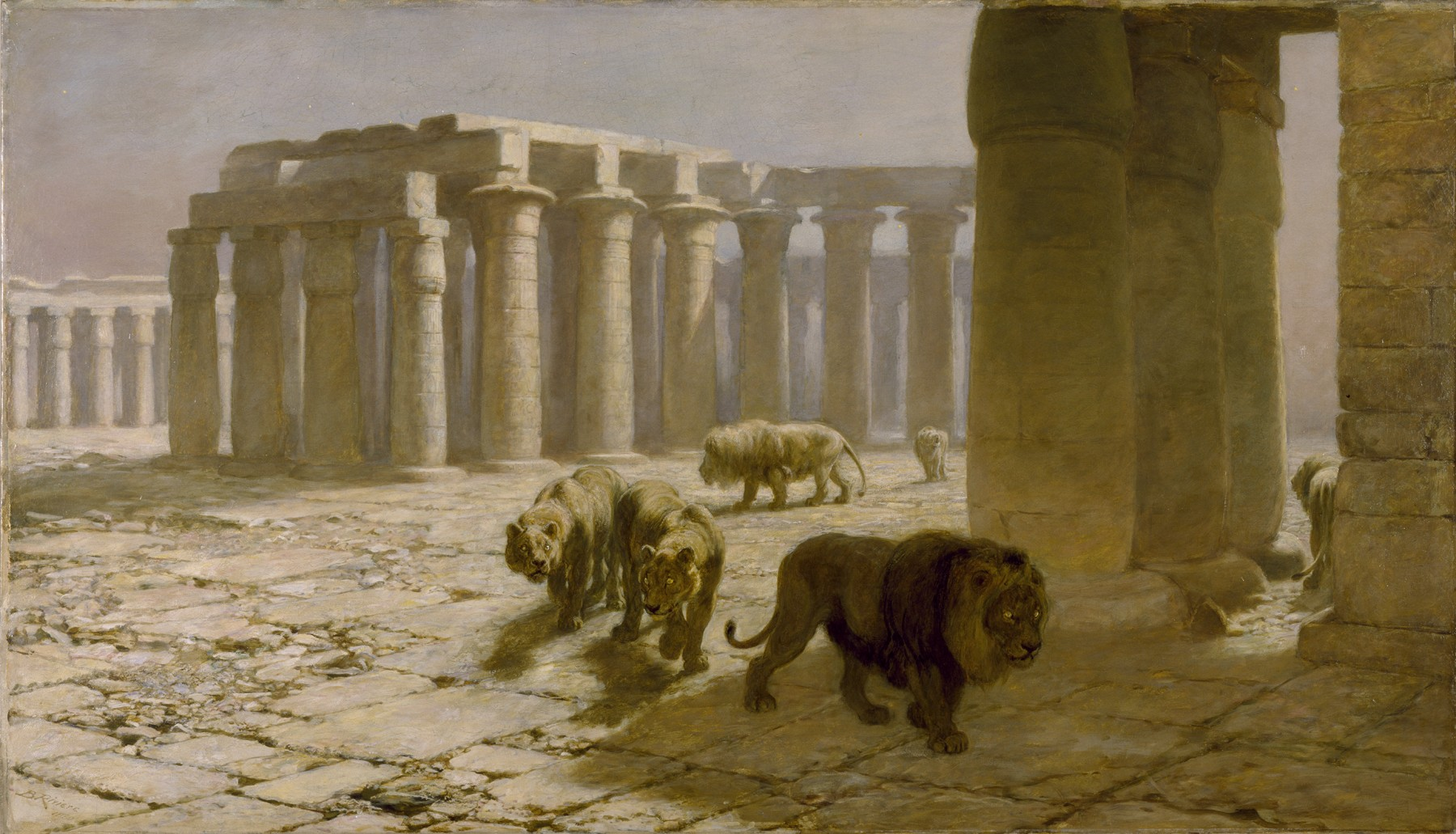
Syria, The Night Watch (1880, Walters Art Museum)

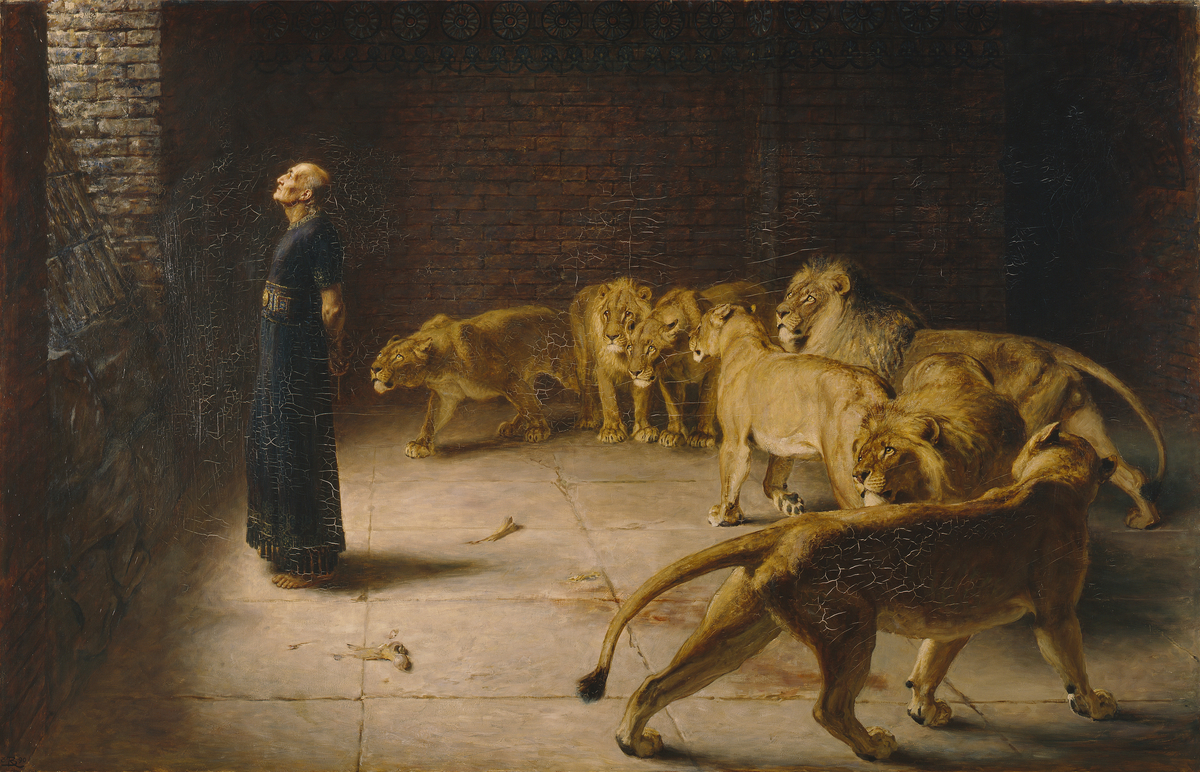
Daniel's Answer to the King (1890; Manchester Art Gallery)

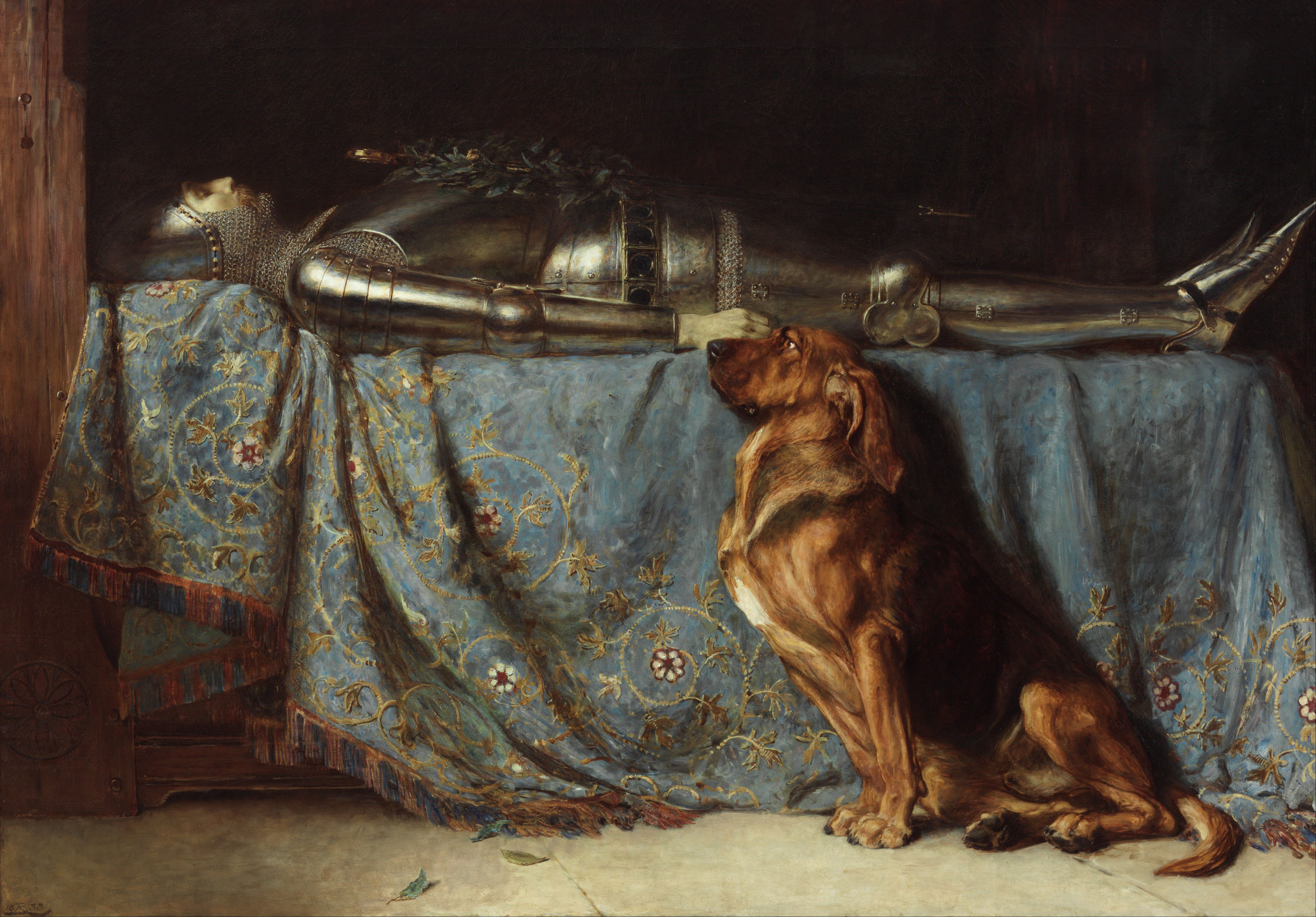
Requiescat (1888; Art Gallery of New South Wales, Sydney)

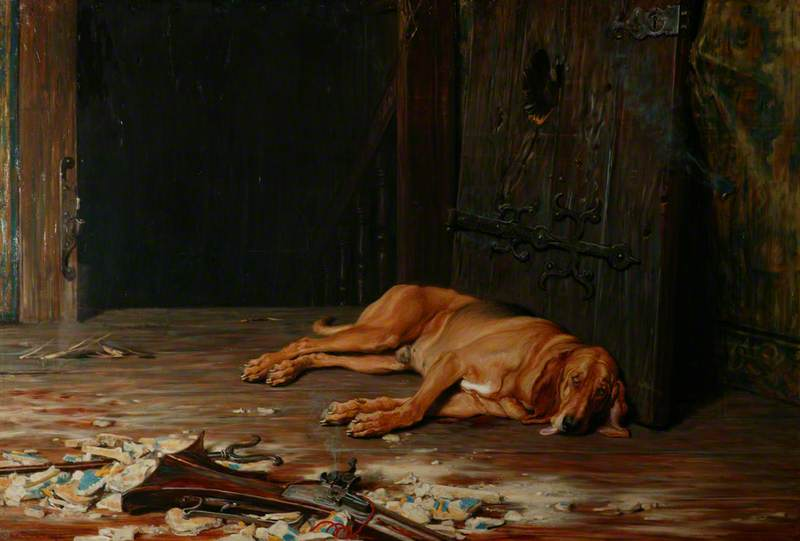
The Last of the Garrison (1875; Manchester Art Gallery)

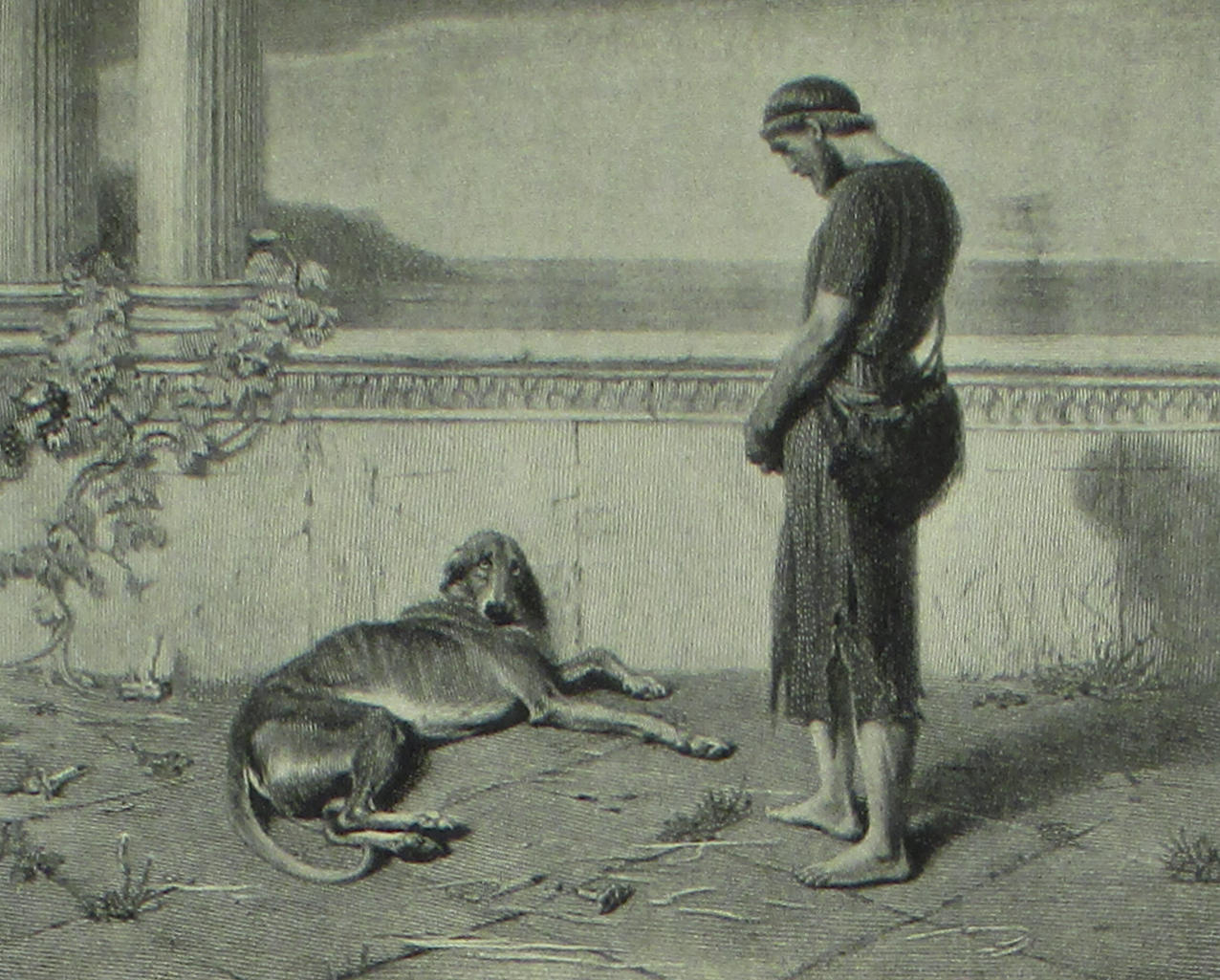
Ulysses and Argus of 1885

== Sources ==
- Armstrong, Sir Walter (1891). Briton Rivière, R.A; His Life and Work, The Art Annual.
- Reynolds, Simon. "Riviere, Briton (1840–1920)". Oxford Dictionary of National Biography (online ed.). Oxford University Press. doi:10.1093/ref:odnb/35766. (Subscription, Wikipedia Library access or UK public library membership required.)
