= Frederick Stacpoole =

British painter

Frederick Stacpoole ARA (1813 – 19 December 1907 London) was a British engraver, who produced reproductions of some of the most popular paintings of the Victorian period.

== Life ==
He was apparently son of Edmund Stacpoole, lieutenant R.N., whose death was reported in the Navy List of January 1816, and whose widow subsequently married a naval captain named Jefferies. He received an education in Ghent, and then became a student at the Royal Academy Schools, gaining two silver medals in December 1839 for a drawing from the antique, and in 1841 for the best copy made in the painting school. He concentrated on engraving.

Stacpoole was a regular exhibitor at the Royal Academy from 1842 to 1899. He was elected an associate on 23 April 1880, the last engraver made associate until the election of Frank Short and William Strang in 1906, and retired from active membership in 1892. He died in London (at his home at 88 Clarendon Road, Putney) on 19 December 1907, and was buried in Brompton cemetery.

== Works ==
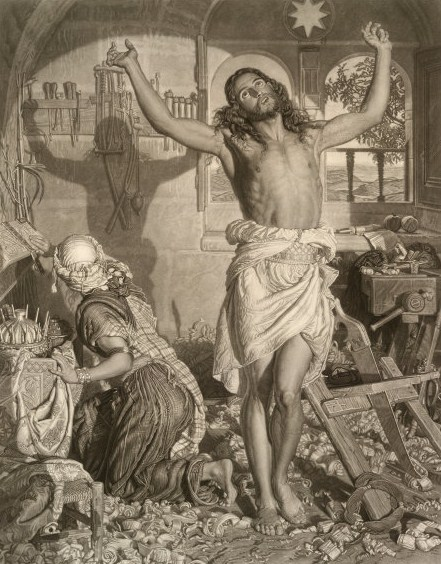
The Shadow of Death, 1878 engraving by Frederick Stacpoole after Holman Hunt

Most of Stacpoole's plates were executed in a mixed mezzotint style (i.e. mezzotint with some line engraving and stipple engraving). His work was only of reproductions, including a large number of prints after Briton Rivière (chiefly published by Messrs. Agnew), Thomas Faed (chiefly published by Messrs. H. Graves), and Charles Burton Barber. He also engraved pictures by others.

Among Stacpoole's successful engravings were the Shadow of Death, after Holman Hunt (1877), and Pot Pourri: Rose Leaves and Lavender, after G. D. Leslie (1881). Popular subjects were the Palm Offering, after Frederick Goodall (1868), and The Roll Call, after Elizabeth Thompson (Lady Butler) (1874).

Stacpoole's first Royal Academy exhibit (1842) was an oil portrait, and he exhibited six other paintings (portrait, subject, and landscape) at the academy between 1843 and 1869, but from 1858 to 1893 his regular contributions were engravings. He also exhibited paintings at the Society of British Artists between 1841 and 1845. Two of his earliest published engravings were after Edwin Landseer, both with other engravers: Peace with T. L. Atkinson (1848), and the Hunted Stag (engraved as Mountain Torrent) with Thomas Landseer (1850) (these both after pictures from the Vernon collection, which went to the National Gallery of British Art). During the last ten years of his life he again took up painting, sending five small subject pictures to the Royal Academy between 1894 and 1899.

== Family ==
In 1844 Stacpoole married Susannah Atkinson, and had issue four daughters and one son.

== Notes ==
Attribution

This article incorporates text from a publication now in the public domain: Lee, Sidney, ed. (1912). "Stacpoole, Frederick". Dictionary of National Biography (2nd supplement). Vol. 3. London: Smith, Elder & Co.
