= William Riviere =

English painter (1806–1876)

William Riviere (1806–1876) sometimes Rivière, was an English painter and art educator.

== Life ==
Born in the parish of St Marylebone, London, on 22 October 1806, was son of Daniel Valentine Riviere, a drawing-master; and brother of Henry Parsons Rivière (1811–1888), another painter, and Robert Riviere. After receiving instruction from his father, he became a student at the Royal Academy. He was noted as a draughtsman, and as a student of Michelangelo and the Roman and Florentine artists. He exhibited first in 1826, when he sent to the Royal Academy a portrait and a scene from Shakespeare's King John.

Later Riviere concentrated on teaching, and in 1849 he was appointed drawing-master at Cheltenham College, where he created a drawing-school. After ten years, he went to Oxford, where he promoted his view that the study of art should form an essential part of higher education. Shortly after arriving In Oxford, Riviere was commissioned by the Oxford Union to complete the set of ten murals within its new debating chamber. Painting of the murals by such artists associated with the Pre-Raphaelite movement as Dante Gabriel Rossetti, Arthur Hughes, Burne-Jones, and William Morris, had begun in August 1857. But by March 1858 the project had been left unfinished, so the Oxford Union commissioned Riviere to complete the last remaining three panels. This he did, his pictures depicting the education of Arthur by Merlin, King Arthur's first victory with the sword, and Arthur's wedding.

Riviere died suddenly, at 36 Beaumont Street, Oxford, on 21 August 1876. A miniature of him when a young man, by Charles William Pegler, went to his son Briton Rivière, R.A., one of four children with his wife from 1830 Ann Jarvis, a still-life painter.

== Works ==
During the 1820s Riviere exhibited at the Royal Academy and the British Institution a number of portraits, domestic subjects, and landscapes. In 1843 he sent to the Westminster Hall competition a cartoon, the subject of which was a "Council of Ancient Britons"; and in 1844 a fresco, An Act of Mercy; and a painting in oils, Council of Ancient Britons. In 1845 he sent to Westminster Hall a sketch, Prince Henry, afterwards Henry V, acknowledging the authority of Chief Justice Gascoigne, with a portion of the subject in fresco; and in 1847 an oil-painting, The Acts of Mercy.

Riviere was also a landscape-painter, both in oil and in watercolours, and a sculptor. His last exhibited work was a portrait of Philip Wynter, president of St John's College, Oxford, which was at the Royal Academy in 1860.
