= Robert Riviere =

British bookbinder

- Example of bookbinding by Riviere & Son, the Rubáiyát of Omar Khayyám
- Born: June 30, 1808; London
- Died: April 12, 1882 (aged 73)
- Occupation: bookbinder

Robert Riviere (30 June 1808 – 12 April 1882), born in London, was a British bookbinder of Huguenot descent.

== Life ==
Riviere was descended from a French family, who left their country on the revocation of the edict of Nantes. His father, Daniel Valentine Riviere (1780–1854), who was a drawing-master of considerable celebrity and a gold medallist of the Royal Academy, married, in 1800, Henrietta Thunder, by whom he had a family of five sons and six daughters. The eldest and third sons, William Rivière and Henry Parsons Rivière were both painters. Anne, the eldest daughter, became the second wife of Sir Henry Rowley Bishop, the composer, and acquired much distinction as a singer.

Robert, the second son, was educated at an academy at Hornsey kept by Mr. Grant, and on leaving school, in 1824, was apprenticed to Messrs. Allman, the booksellers, of Princes Street, Hanover Square, London. In 1829 he established himself at Bath as a bookseller, and subsequently as a bookbinder in a small way, employing only one man. But not finding sufficient scope for his talents in that city, he came in 1840 to London, where he commenced business as a bookbinder at 28 Great Queen Street, Lincoln's Inn Fields, afterwards removing to 196 Piccadilly.

The excellent workmanship and good taste displayed in his bindings gradually won for them the appreciation of connoisseurs, and he was largely employed by the Duke of Devonshire, Samuel Christie-Miller, Captain Francis Capper Brooke and other great collectors. He also bound for the queen and the royal family. In the Great Exhibition of 1851 he exhibited several examples of his skill, and he was awarded a medal. He was chosen by the council to bind one thousand copies of the large ‘Illustrated Catalogue,’ intended for presentation to ‘all the crowned heads in Europe’ and other distinguished persons. It is said that two thousand skins of the best red Morocco, as well as fifteen hundred yards of silk for the linings of the covers, were used by Riviere for this undertaking. He also restored and bound the famous Domesday Book, now preserved in the Record Office.

While the binding of Riviere, like that of his fellow-craftsman, Francis Bedford, is deficient in originality, it is in all other respects—in the quality of the materials, the forwarding, and in the finish and delicacy of the tooling—deserving of commendation. Taking into consideration the fact that he was entirely self-taught, his bindings are specimens of artistic taste, skill, and perseverance. He died at his residence, 47 Gloucester Road, Regent's Park, on 12 April 1882, and was buried in the churchyard at East End, Finchley.

Riviere married, in 1830, Eliza Sarah Pegler, by whom he had two daughters. He bequeathed his business to the eldest son of the second daughter, Mr. Percival Calkin, who had been taken into partnership by his grandfather in 1880, when the style of the firm was altered to Robert Riviere & Son.

Riviere bindings may be dated approximately by the stamped signature inside the front covers: Bound by R. Riviere, Bath means 1829–32; Bound by R. Riviere means 1832–40; Bound by Riviere means 1840–c.1860; Bound by Riviere & Son means after 1880. The heirs of George Bayntun of Bath bought out Riviere & Sons.
