= 1878 in art =

Events from the year 1878 in art.

== Events ==
- 1 May – The Exposition Universelle opens in Paris, including a large section devoted to the Fine Arts
- 6 May – The Royal Academy Exhibition of 1878 opens at Burlington House in London
- 25 May – The Salon of 1878 opens at the Palace of Industry in Paris
- 25 November – 26 – James McNeill Whistler's libel case against English art critic John Ruskin over a scathing 1877 review of Whistler's painting Nocturne in Black and Gold – The Falling Rocket is heard in the High Court of Justice in London. Whistler wins a farthing in nominal damages and only half of the costs, leading to his bankruptcy, and alienates patrons.
- French critic Théodore Duret publishes the pamphlet Les Peintres impressionistes.
- Czech painter Karel Klíč perfects the photogravure process.

== Works ==
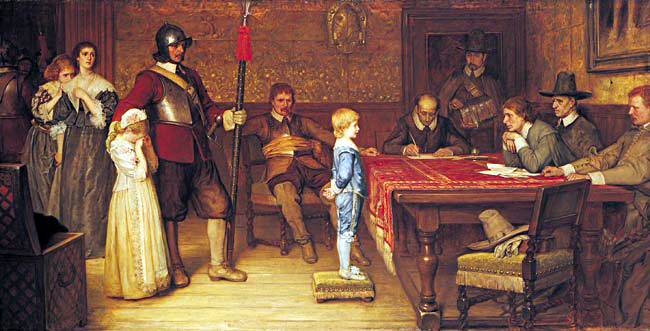
W.F. Yeames – And When Did You Last See Your Father?

- Ivan Aivazovsky – Sea View by Moonlight
- Jules Bastien-Lepage
  - Les Enfants Pecheurs ("The child fishers")
  - Les Foins ("Haymaking")
- Reinhold Begas – Mercury and Psyche (marble, Berlin, Germany)
- Emmanuel Benner – Lakeside Dwelling
- Gustave Caillebotte
  - Bather about to dive
  - The Canoes (Museum of Fine Arts of Rennes)
  - Fisherman on the bank of the Yerres
  - The Orange Trees
  - Rue Halévy: view from the sixth floor
  - View of rooftops, effect of snow
- Mary Cassatt
  - In the Loge
  - Portrait of the Artist
- Eduard Charlemont – The Moorish Chief
- William Merritt Chase
  - A Fishmarket in Venice
  - The Mandolin Player
- Stanisław Chlebowski – Sultan Bayezid prisoned by Timur
- James Collinson – The Holy Family
- Evelyn De Morgan – Night and Sleep
- Maurycy Gottlieb – Jews Praying in the Synagogue on Yom Kippur
- Peter Graham – Wandering Shadows
- Jean-Jacques Henner
  - The Magdalene
  - Portrait of M. Hayem
- Ivan Kramskoi – Portrait of the Artist Alexander Litovchenko
- Robert Walker Macbeth – Sedge Cutting in Wicken Fen, Cambridgeshire, early morning
- Édouard Manet
  - At the Café
  - Blonde Woman with Bare Breasts (Musée d'Orsay, Paris)
  - The Plum
  - The Rue Mosnier with Flags
- Jan Matejko – Battle of Grunwald
- John Everett Millais
  - The Bride of Lammermoor
  - A Jersey Lily
  - The Princes in the Tower
- Pierre-Auguste Renoir – Madame Georges Charpentier and her children
- Ilya Repin – Self-portrait
- Briton Rivière
  - An Anxious Moment
  - Persepolis
- Auguste Rodin – The Walking Man (bronze)
- Félicien Rops – Pornocrates
- Dante Gabriel Rossetti
  - The Blessed Damozel (probable completion date)
  - A Vision of Fiammetta
- John Singer Sargent – Setting Out to Fish
- August Friedrich Schenck - Anguish
- Alfred Sisley – Snow at Louveciennes (Musée d'Orsay, Paris)
- Elizabeth Thompson – Listed for the Connaught Rangers
- James Tissot
  - Kathleen Newton In An Armchair
  - Seaside
- Viktor Vasnetsov – The Knight at the Crossroads
- Hubert von Herkomer – Eventide: A Scene in the Westminster Union
- James McNeill Whistler – Effie Deans
- William Frederick Yeames – And When Did You Last See Your Father? (Walker Art Gallery, Liverpool)

== Births ==
- 4 January – Augustus John, Welsh painter (died 1961)
- 16 January – Karl Isakson, Swedish painter (died 1922)
- 14 February – Bohumil Kafka, Bohemian Czech sculptor (died 1942)
- 27 February – Max Silberberg, German Jewish industrialist and art collector (killed after 1942)
- 4 March – Charles Ginner, English painter (died 1952)
- 12 March – Gerda Höglund, Swedish religious painter (died 1973)
- 27 March – Kathleen Bruce (later Lady Scott), English sculptor (died 1947)
- 28 March – Abraham Walkowitz, American Modernist painter (died 1965)
- 1 April – Alfred Flechtheim, German art dealer, collector and publisher (died 1937)
- 2 April – Émilie Charmy, French artist (died 1974)
- 24 April – Jean Crotti, French painter (died 1958)
- 26 May – Spencer Gore, English painter (died 1914)
- 10 July – Otto Freundlich, German painter and sculptor (died 1943)
- 9 August – Eileen Gray, Irish furniture designer and architect (died 1976)
- 7 October – Feliu Elias, Spanish caricaturist and painter (died 1948)
- 8 October – Alfred Munnings, English equine painter (died 1959)
- 14 November – Julie Manet, French painter and art collector (died 1966)
- 23 November – Frank Pick, English transport administrator and patron of art and design (died 1941)
- 24 November – Norman Wilkinson, English marine artist (died 1971)
- 27 November – William Orpen, Irish portrait painter (died 1931)

== Deaths ==
- January 26 – Théophile Schuler, French painter and illustrator (born 1821)
- February – Tito Angelini, Italian sculptor (born 1806)
- February 9 – Nicolas Gosse, French historical painter (born 1787)
- February 19
  - George Paul Chalmers, Scottish painter (born 1833; died as the result of a street attack)
  - Charles-François Daubigny, French painter (born 1817)
- February 26 – Alexandre Antigna, French painter (born 1817)
- March 3 – Joseph Bonomi the Younger, English sculptor, artist, Egyptologist and museum curator (born 1796)
- April 14 – Ludovic Piette, French impressionist painter (born 1826)
- April 23 – Jaroslav Čermák, Czech historical painter (born 1831)
- May 25 – Antoine Laurent Dantan, French academic sculptor (born 1798)
- June 10 – Tranquillo Cremona, Italian painter (born 1837)
- June 16 – Kikuchi Yōsai, Japanese painter most famous for his monochrome portraits of historical figures (born 1788)
- August 21 – Conrad Martens, English-born landscape painter (born 1801)
- October 5 – Francis Grant, Scottish painter (born 1803)
- November 11 – Robert Havell, Jr., English principal engraver of Audubon's The Birds of America (born 1793)
- November 16 – Đura Jakšić, Serbian painter and poet (born 1832)
- December 19 – Joseph Nash, English watercolour painter and lithographer (born 1809)
- date unknown – Amédée Faure, French portrait painter (born 1801)
