= Reception of the Grand Condé at Versailles =

Painting by Jean-Léon Gérôme

- Réception du Grand Condé à Versailles (French), Réception du Grand Condé par Louis XIV
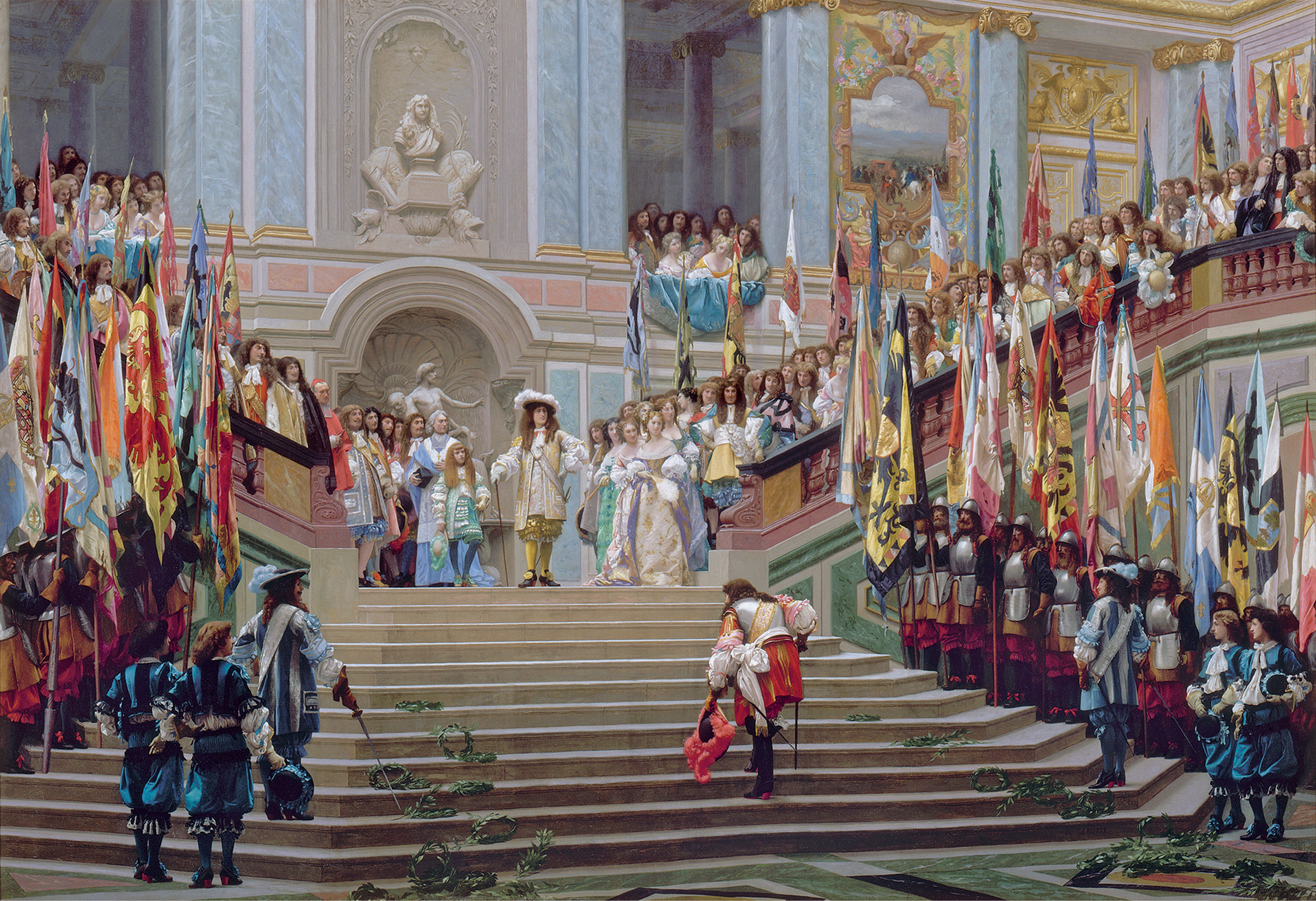
- Artist: Jean-Léon Gérôme
- Year: 1878
- Catalogue: RF 2004 15
- Medium: Oil painting
- Movement: Academic art
- Subject: Louis, Grand Condé being received by Louis XIV at the Palace of Versailles
- Dimensions: 96.5 cm × 139.7 cm (38.0 in × 55.0 in)
- Location: Musée d'Orsay, Paris

Reception of the Grand Condé at Versailles (French: Réception du Grand Condé à Versailles), also known as Reception of the Grand Condé by Louis XIV (Réception du Grand Condé par Louis XIV), is a painting by Jean-Léon Gérôme, painted in 1878. It represents the reception of Louis II de Bourbon-Condé by Louis XIV, at the Palace of Versailles, at the foot of the Escalier des Ambassadeurs [fr], in 1674. The painting was acquired in 2004 by the Musée d'Orsay.

== Analysis ==
Following the mixed success of another of his paintings, Siècle d'Auguste : naissance de N. S. Jésus Christ (Exposition Universelle of 1855), Gérôme chose to focus on “small” history. In this painting he highlighted the comedy of power, through the belated allegiance of the prince to his king. The taste for reconstruction and the painter's precision are found in the representation of the rich court costumes, and in the reproduction of the monumental Escalier des Ambassadeurs de Versailles, destroyed more than a century earlier.

== History ==
Gérôme's painting was acquired in 2004 by the Musée d'Orsay.

In 2014, the painting was loaned to the Museum of Fine Arts of Lyon as part of the exhibition L'invention du Passé. Histoires de cœur et d'épée 1802-1850 [fr].
