= Benna Moe =

Danish composer and musician

Benna Olufine Charlotte Moe (December 15, 1897 - Dec. 27, 1983) was a Danish composer and musician.

In addition to her compositional gifts, Benna Moe was an organ soloist, pianist and singer. She composed music for orchestra, chamber ensembles, and organ music. Most known among her works is the ballet Hybris, which was premiered in Copenhagen in 1930. Her compositions, Hymn of Praise (4th movement of Alpine Suite), Shepherds’ Flutes (2nd movement of Alpine Suite) and Cantilena have been used at royal weddings.

== Early life ==
Moe entered the Moltke Citizen School for girls, and it was here that her special musical abilities stimulated her musical participation. Moe often played at school party events and family gatherings, and began to compose at the age of 12. Eventually, she delved into larger compositions, such as an overture to the celebration of the 100th anniversary of Johanne Luise Heiberg's birth in 1913. She maintained contact with the school long after she was grown. At Moltke's funeral in 1928, she played his elegy on the Frederik church organ. She played at numerous charity events before, during and after World War II, and for many family celebrations. She wrote music for festive events in the Danish and Swedish royal families, such as a tribute march to King Gustav V of Sweden, and a wedding waltz to the heir to the throne, princess Margrethe of Denmark. Moe grew up in a solid, bourgeois middle-class environment, and her older brothers supported her musical talent. One of them, Olaf Edward M., was a bookseller and publisher, and he made sure that several of her early compositions were printed. In addition, he created contacts for the American publisher Arthur P. Schmidt, who published several of her works, including Alpine Suite for Organ in 1929.

== Career ==
Moe had a long career as an organist, pianist, singer and composer. Her force was melodic inventiveness and a superior improvisation talent. Furthermore, she had a beautiful mezzo-soprano voice. Her formal musical education was quite limited. She was given piano lessons as a child at Dagmar Walsøe CFE Horne's Institute of Music. Later, she received private lessons over the course of eighteen months with organist E. Thune. In 1915, she was afforded the opportunity to audition as an independent student by way of the organist's exam at the Music Academy. Graduating with honor, the examiners commended her skills at the organ.

By 1930, Moe was very active as a composer and musician. She wrote well over 200 songs in this period. Genres included many marches, tangos, and in the style of the foxtrot. Her songs in the romantic style were melodic and ranged from the simple and intimate to the large-scale and partly through-composed. In 1933 she appeared for the first time in Danish radio, where she sang her own songs. She later performed for several broadcasts. Her only string quartet was composed in 1934. It was played in Vienna by an Austrian women's string quartet, led by violinist Anita Ast. In 1937 she had a commitment to Holberg Haven in National-Scala in Copenhagen. One reviewer in the National Journal wrote, "In the rise of the composer within Benna Moe, as with fine Music Sans and lady-like attitude, she directs her own compositions." She continued to conduct many of her own pieces, namely in 1950, when she, while in Stockholm, led a military band that played her Orphée Marche. Moe's connection with Sweden was fully established in the 1930s. She had previously had several compositions presented on Swedish radio and at public concerts in Gothenburg and Helsingborg. In 1937 she made a program on Swedish radio with the cellist C. Coster which was very well received. She also sang at an orchestra concert in Ystad in 1938, where her "välskolade mezzo-soprano" and "livfulla lecture" became famous. She made many friends in Sweden, including composer H. Alfvén, organist O. Olsson and painter Gerda Höglund. From 1941-48, she stayed in Sweden, where she gave several concerts, including a tour in 1944, in which she performed at concerts for 22 days in a row. She eventually settled in the town of Mora as a composer and music educator.

== Personal life ==
Moe was unmarried and lived most of her adult life with her friend, a language teacher Karla Aagaard. Aagaard supported Moe in her travels. Moe's music has rarely been performed after her death, but recordings do exist on labels Tono and Musica at the Royal Library. There are amateur tape recordings from the 1950s and 1960s of her as a vocalist.

Her last major performance was in Sweden, when she was 84 years old.

== Works ==
Instrumental music:

- Instructive Studies for piano, Op. 3
- Instructive Studies for piano, Op. 6 (1918): 1. Presto e leggiero, 2. Bækken (The Brook), 3. Allegro moderato
- Instructive Studies for piano, Op. 9 (1923): 1. Venezia, 2. Tarantelle, 3. Ballabile
- Serenade du Gondolier for piano, Op. 11
- Alpine Suite for organ, op. 12 (1929)
- Polonaise de Fête for piano 4 hands (1928)
- Concert Suite for organ (1971)
- Suite "Ancienne" for organ (1972)
- Cantilena for organ (1972)
- Preludes for organ (1977)
- Legend for organ (1980)
- Fox-trots for piano
- Tangos for piano
- Waltzes for piano
- Marches for piano

Chamber music:

- Berceuse for violin and piano (1914)
- Danse Espagnole for violin and piano (1928)
- Intermezzo for violin and piano (1931)
- String Quartet (1934)
- Meditation for violin and piano (1969)

Other music:

- Music for the ballet Hubris (1930)
- over 200 songs in a romantic style,
- a tribute march to King Gustav V of Sweden
- one wedding waltz to the heir to the throne Princess Margrethe of Denmark
- cantata for Odd Fellows in Mora
- a passion play
