= Scape (botany) =

Long non-woody leafless segment between two leaf-bearing regions of a plant

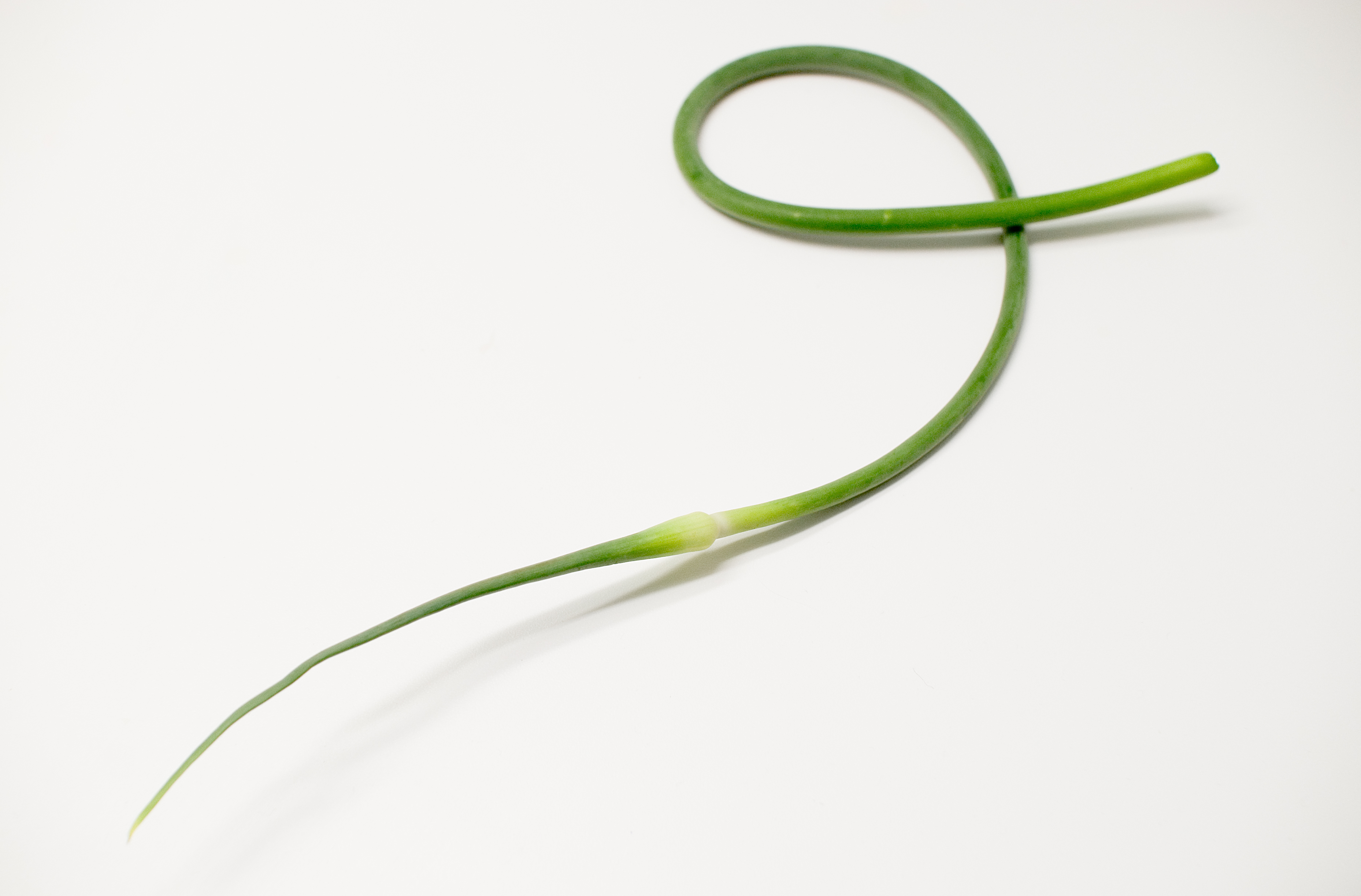
A garlic scape

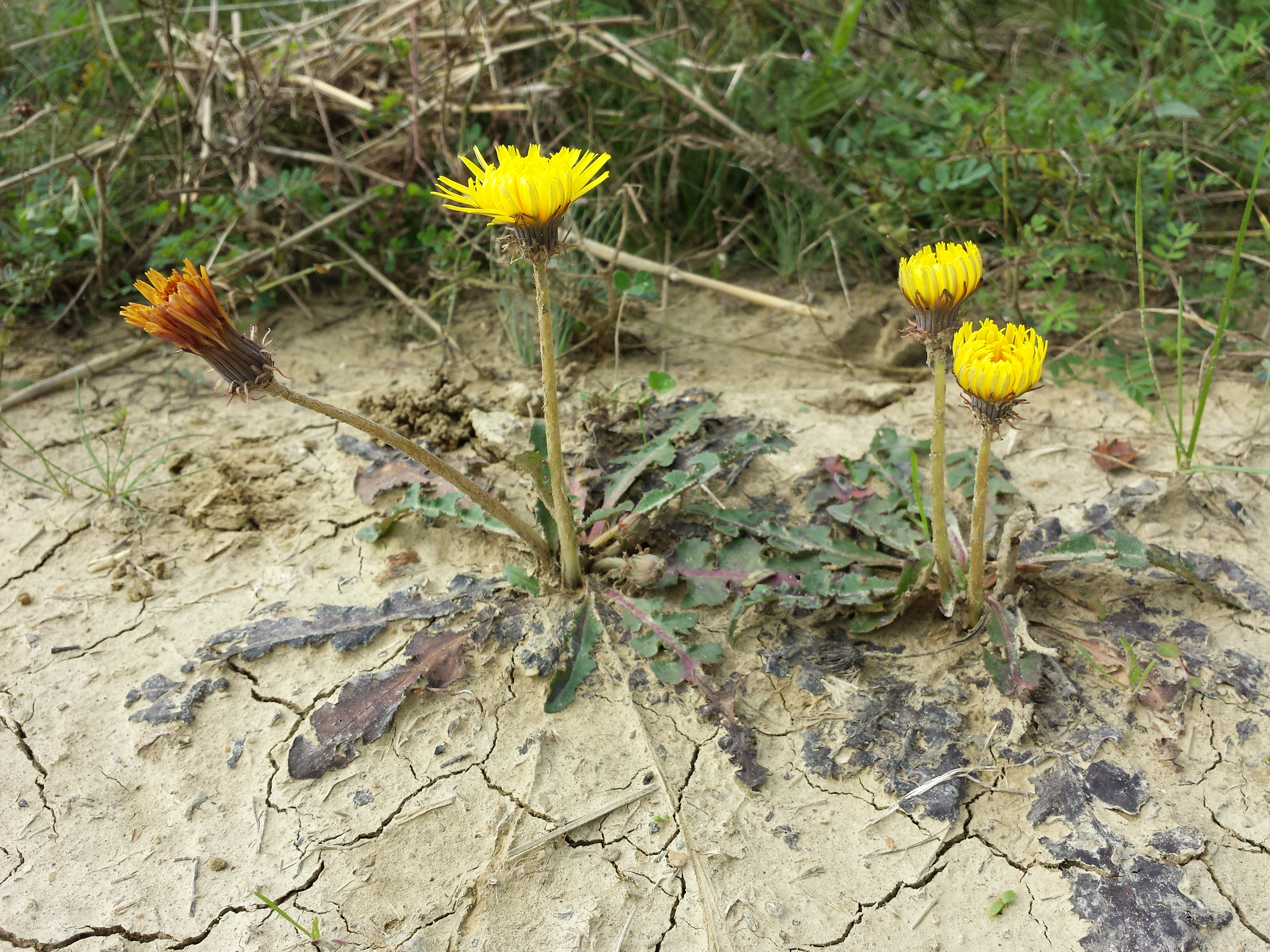
Dandelions have a single capitulum at the end of the scape

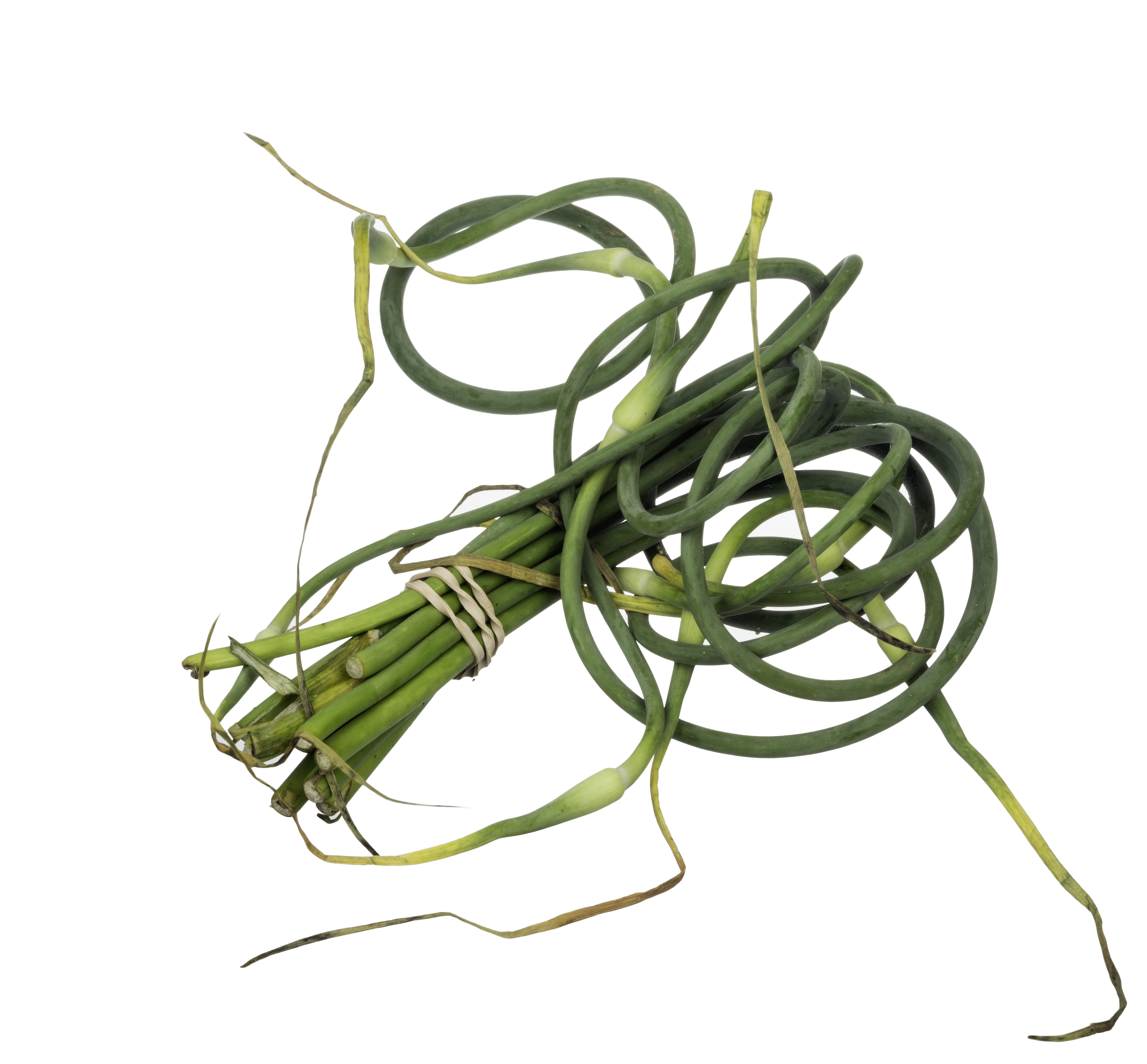
A bundle of garlic scapes

In botany, a scape is a peduncle arising from a subterranean or very compressed stem, with the lower internodes very long and hence few or no bracts except the part near the rachis or receptacle. Typically it takes the form of a long, leafless flowering stem rising directly from a bulb, rhizome, or similar subterranean or underwater structure.

The scapes of scallions, chives, garlic chives, and garlic are used as vegetables.

== Etymology and usages ==
The word scape (Latin scapus, from Greek σκᾶπος), as used in botany, is fairly vague and arbitrary; various sources provide divergent definitions. Some older usages simply amount to a stem or stalk in general, but modern formal usage tends to favour the likes of "A long flower stalk rising directly from the root or rhizome", or "a long, naked, or nearly naked, peduncle, rising direct from the base of a plant, whether 1- or many-fid." Other authorities refer to the scape rising directly from the ground, without morphological analysis. For example: "A leafless floral axis or peduncle arising from the ground, as in Cyclamen".

== Practical definition ==
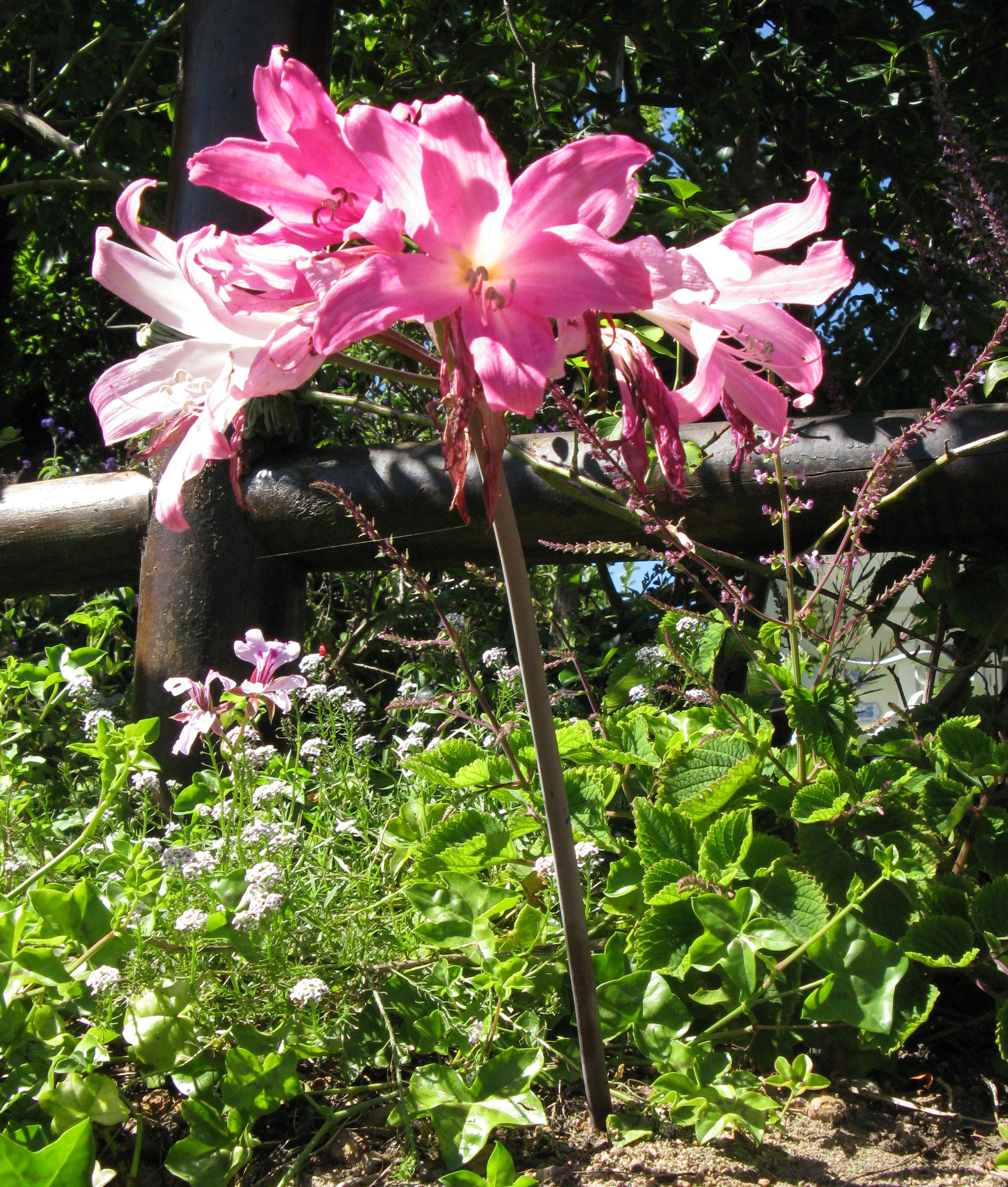
Amaryllis belladonna, its scape emerging directly from the bulb immediately underground

The modern trend is towards usefully distinguishing the definition of "scape" from those of related, but more general, terms such as peduncle and inflorescence. It now is rarely used for such objects as stems or inflorescences in general. However, it is not easy to find coherent and fully general definitions. Typical examples from authoritative online sources include the following: "a peduncle arising at or beneath the surface of the ground in an acaulescent plant... broadly: a flower stalk...", "a leafless stalk in plants that arises from a rosette of leaves and bears one or more flowers..." and several more very similar.

All those definitions are descriptive, but morphologically vacuous. In contrast, a professional botanical publication puts the matter plainly in a key to Eriogonum: "Scapes (the first internode)... Botanically, any such structure is practically of necessity an internode".

== Description ==
In the purest sense, that of a smooth stem without leaves or branches, a scape is a single internode. It might comprise an entire peduncle with just one flower (e.g. Tulipa) or just the basal internode of a peduncle. This is in contrast to the typical compound peduncle, which morphologically speaking is derived from a branch, or from an entire shoot.

A single scape may bear a single flower or many, depending on the species. When it bears more than one flower, there is the terminal part of an inflorescence on top, as in Amaryllis. Compare this with say, the peduncle of Agave, which sensu stricto, is not a scape.

Scapes are found on plants of many families, including Amaryllidaceae, Asphodelaceae, Balsaminaceae, Liliaceae, Papaveraceae, Droseraceae, and Violaceae.
