= Blonde Woman with Bare Breasts =

Painting by Édouard Manet

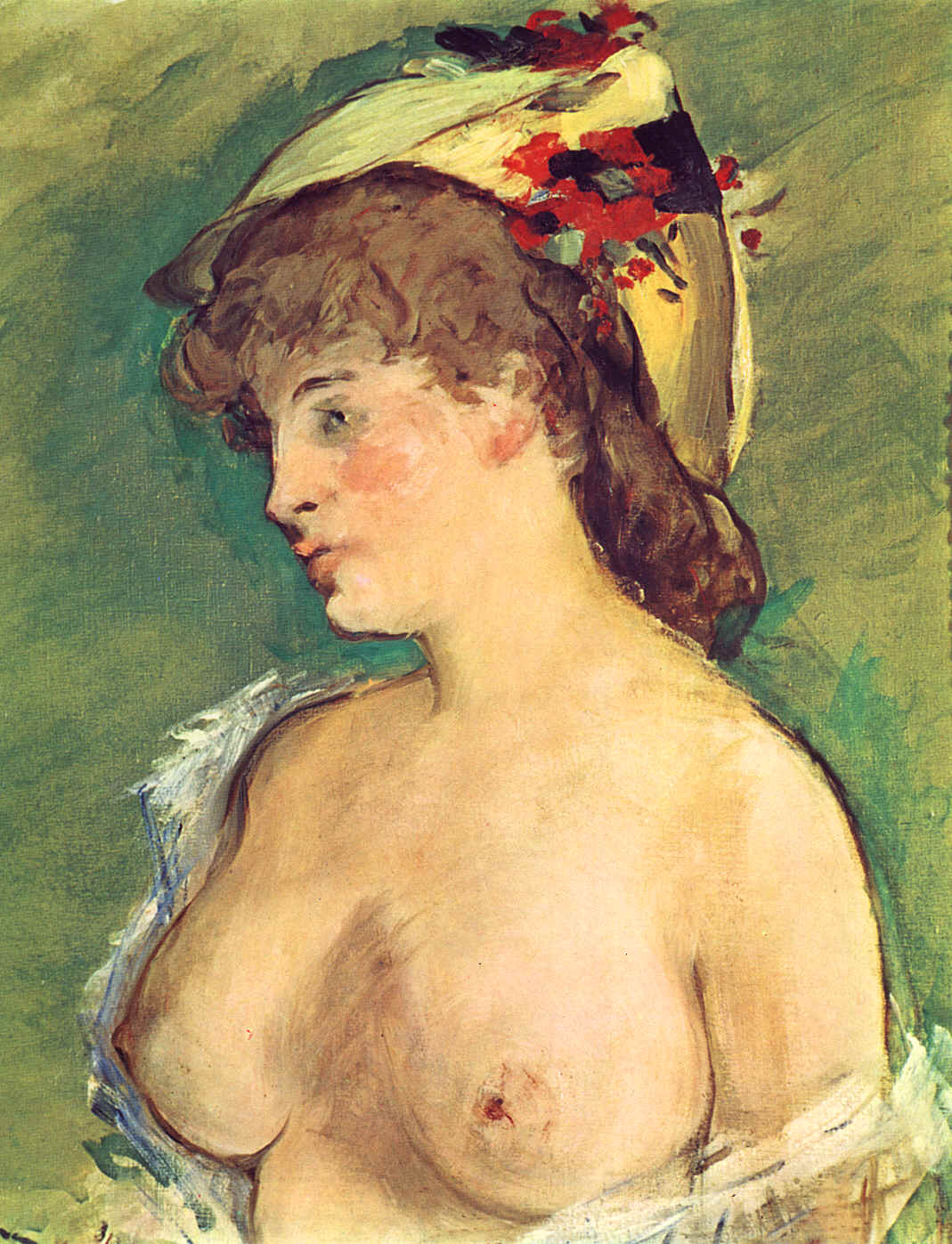
- Artist: Édouard Manet
- Year: 1878
- Medium: Oil on canvas
- Dimensions: 62.5 cm × 52 cm (24.6 in × 20 in)
- Location: Musée d'Orsay, Paris
- Accession: RF 2637
- Website: www.musee-orsay.fr/en/artworks/la-blonde-aux-seins-nus-1011

Blonde Woman with Bare Breasts (French: La Blonde aux seins nus) is a painting by Édouard Manet, executed c. 1878, now in the Musée d'Orsay in Paris. Contrary to its title, it shows a brunette.

== See also ==
- List of paintings by Édouard Manet
- 1878 in art
