= Hélène Marie Antigna =

French painter (1837–1918)

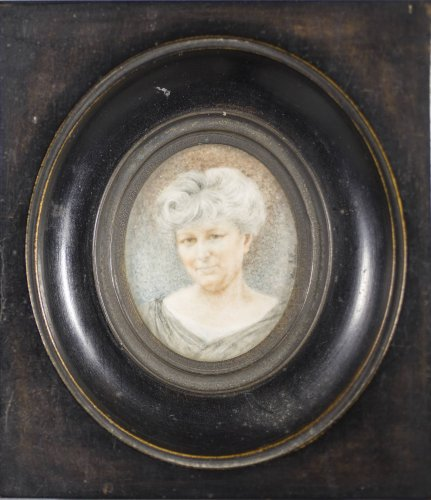
- Born: 8 July 1837; Melun, France
- Died: 10 March 1918 (aged 80)
- Education: Jean Pierre Antigna and Eugène Delacroix
- Occupation: painter

Hélène Marie Antigna (8 July 1837 – 10 March 1918) was a French painter.

Hélène-Marie Pettit was born at Melun, 8 July 1837. She was a pupil of her husband, Jean Pierre Antigna, and of Eugène Delacroix. Her best works are small genre subjects. She exhibited every year after 1861; Chercheuse de bois mort (1861) and Retour du contrebandier (1868) are mentioned. In 1877, she exhibited at the Paris Salon, On n'entre pas! and the New Cider; in 1876, an Interior at Saint Brieuc and A Stable; in 1875, Tant va la cruche à l'eau.

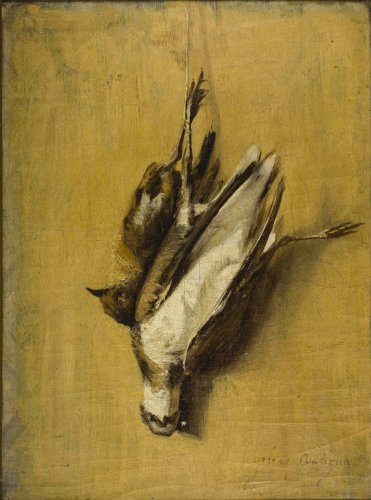
Hélène Antigna, Dead bird (c. 1870).
