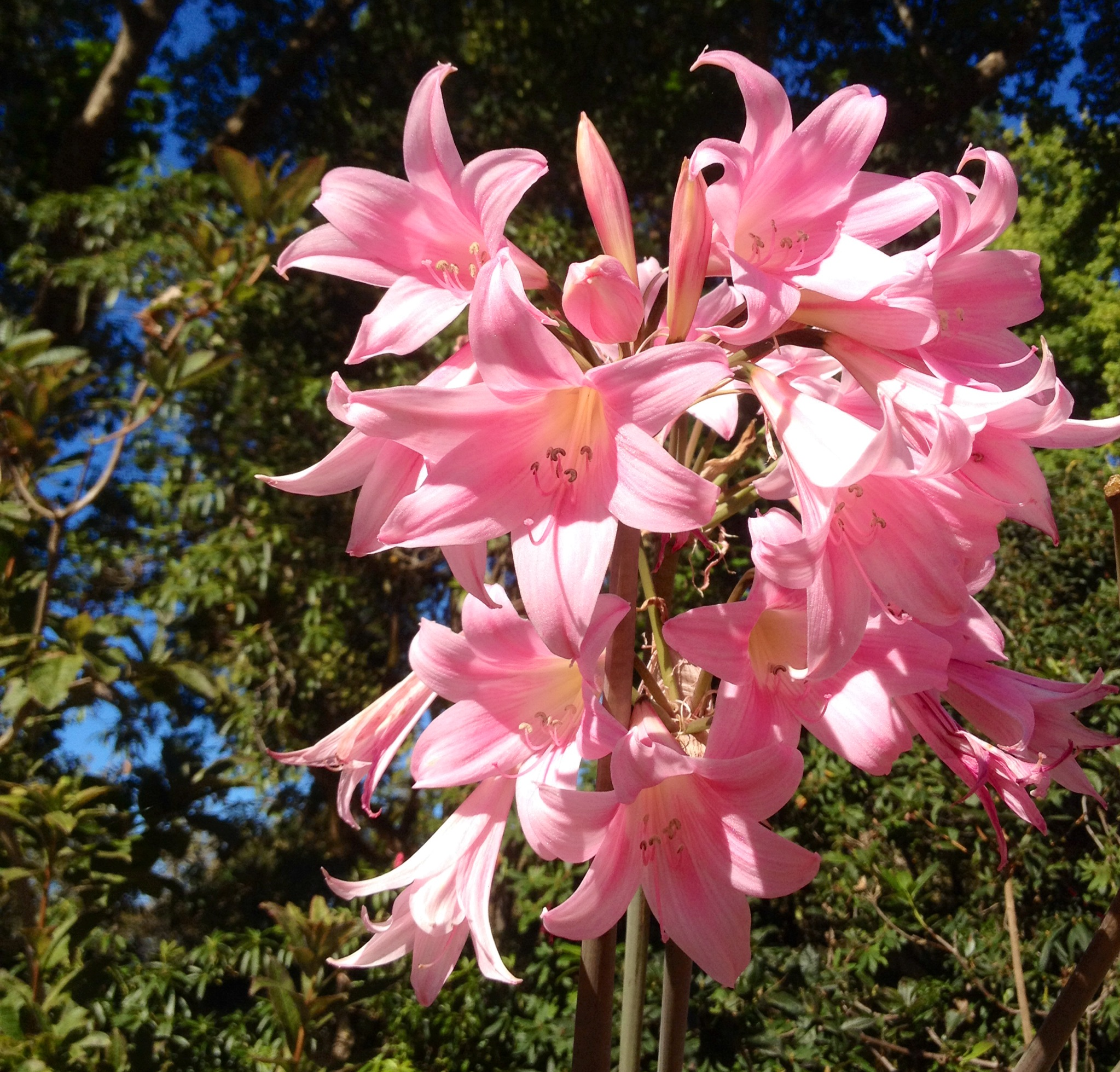

Scientific classification
- Kingdom: Plantae
- Clade: Tracheophytes
- Clade: Angiosperms
- Clade: Monocots
- Order: Asparagales
- Family: Amaryllidaceae
- Subfamily: Amaryllidoideae
- Genus: Amaryllis
- Species: A. belladonna

Binomial name
- Amaryllis belladonna L.

Synonyms
- Species synonymy: Amaryllis blanda Ker Gawl.; Amaryllis longipetala Lem.; Amaryllis obliqua L.f. ex Savage; Amaryllis pallida Delile; Amaryllis pudica Ker Gawl.; Amaryllis regalis Salisb.; Amaryllis rosea Lam.; Belladonna blanda (Ker Gawl.) Sweet; Belladonna pallida (Delile) Sweet; Belladonna pudica (Ker Gawl.) Sweet; Belladonna purpurascens Sweet; Brunsvigia blanda (Ker Gawl.) L.S.Hannibal; Brunsvigia major Traub; Brunsvigia rosea (Lam.) L.S.Hannibal; Brunsvigia rosea var. blanda (Ker Gawl.) Traub; Brunsvigia rosea var. elata L.S.Hannibal; Brunsvigia rosea var. longipetala (Lem.) Traub; Brunsvigia rosea var. major L.S.Hannibal; Brunsvigia rosea var. minor L.S.Hannibal; Brunsvigia rosea var. pallida (Delile) L.S.Hannibal; Brunsvigia rosea var. pudica (Ker Gawl.) L.S.Hannibal; Callicore rosea (Lam.) Link; Coburgia belladonna (L.) Herb.; Coburgia blanda (Ker Gawl.) Herb.; Coburgia pallida (Delile) Herb.; Coburgia pudica (Ker Gawl.) Herb.; Coburgia rosea (Lam.) Gouws; Imhofia rosea (Lam.) Salisb.; Leopoldia belladonna (L.) M.Roem.; Zephyranthes pudica (Ker Gawl.) D.Dietr.

= Amaryllis belladonna =

Species of flowering plant

Amaryllis belladonna, the Jersey lily, belladonna-lily, naked-lady-lily, or March lily, is a plant species native to Cape Province in South Africa but widely cultivated as an ornamental. It is reportedly naturalized in many places: Corsica, Portugal, the Azores, Madeira, the Canary Islands, the Scilly Isles of Great Britain, the Democratic Republic of the Congo, Ascension Island, Australia, New Zealand, Mexico, Cuba, Haiti, the Dominican Republic, Chile, California, Texas, Louisiana, Mississippi, Michigan, Indiana and the Juan Fernández Islands.

== Description ==
Perennial bulbous geophyte with one to two erect solid stems which appear in late summer. The inflorescence bears 2–12 showy fragrant funnel-shaped flowers on a 'naked' (leafless) stem, which gives it the common name of naked-lady-lily. The pink flowers which may be up to 10 cm (3.9 in) in length, appear in the autumn before the leaves (hysteranthy) which are narrow and strap shaped.

== Taxonomy and etymology ==
Amaryllis belladonna is one of the two species in the genus Amaryllis as currently circumscribed.

The specific epithet belladonna is derived from the Italian bella donna, which means beautiful lady.

== Habitat ==
Amaryllis belladonna is found in South Africa, where the plants are found growing among rocks.

== Ecology ==
Leaves of A. belladonna begin growing in early spring, or during late autumn. They last for a few weeks to a few months until they wither away, and a flower stalk will begin growing. When found in the wild, Amaryllis belladonna is pollinated by hawk moths and carpenter bees. The flower has a long-tubed, pale perianth, which fully expands at night. This flower will then release a sweet fragrance, that contains acyclic terpenoid alcohol, linalool and abundant nectar, that attracts pollinators to it. A. belladonna seeds are soft and fleshy, and appear white or pinkish. They are dispersed through wind dispersal during the winter time. This is to coincide with the first winter rain during March, and April. Seeds will germinate in as early as two weeks, but will not develop into a fully flowering plant until three to six years later.

All parts of the A. belladonna plant are toxic and contain several different alkaloids, such as lycorine, pancracine and amaryllidine. This can cause vomiting and diarrhea in humans. In wildlife these toxins will affect grazing species, and will cause drooling, vomiting, diarrhea, abdominal distress, lethargy, and heart or renal failure. Deer will avoid eating this plant, possibly due to an evolutionary relationship.

== Cultivation ==
The bulbs are best planted just below the surface of the soil, with the neck of the bulb level with the surface. In colder climates mulching or lifting and overwintering is required. The bulbs may be propagated from offsets. Amaryllis bulbs require little watering and are drought tolerant. This plant has gained the Royal Horticultural Society's Award of Garden Merit.

== Medicinal properties ==
Several compounds have been found in A. belladonna bulbs, including, 1,4-dihydroxy-3-methoxy powellan, which is an alkaloid. It has been observed that alkaloids in this plants bulb have properties to fight against malaria caused by P. falciparum.

== Gallery ==
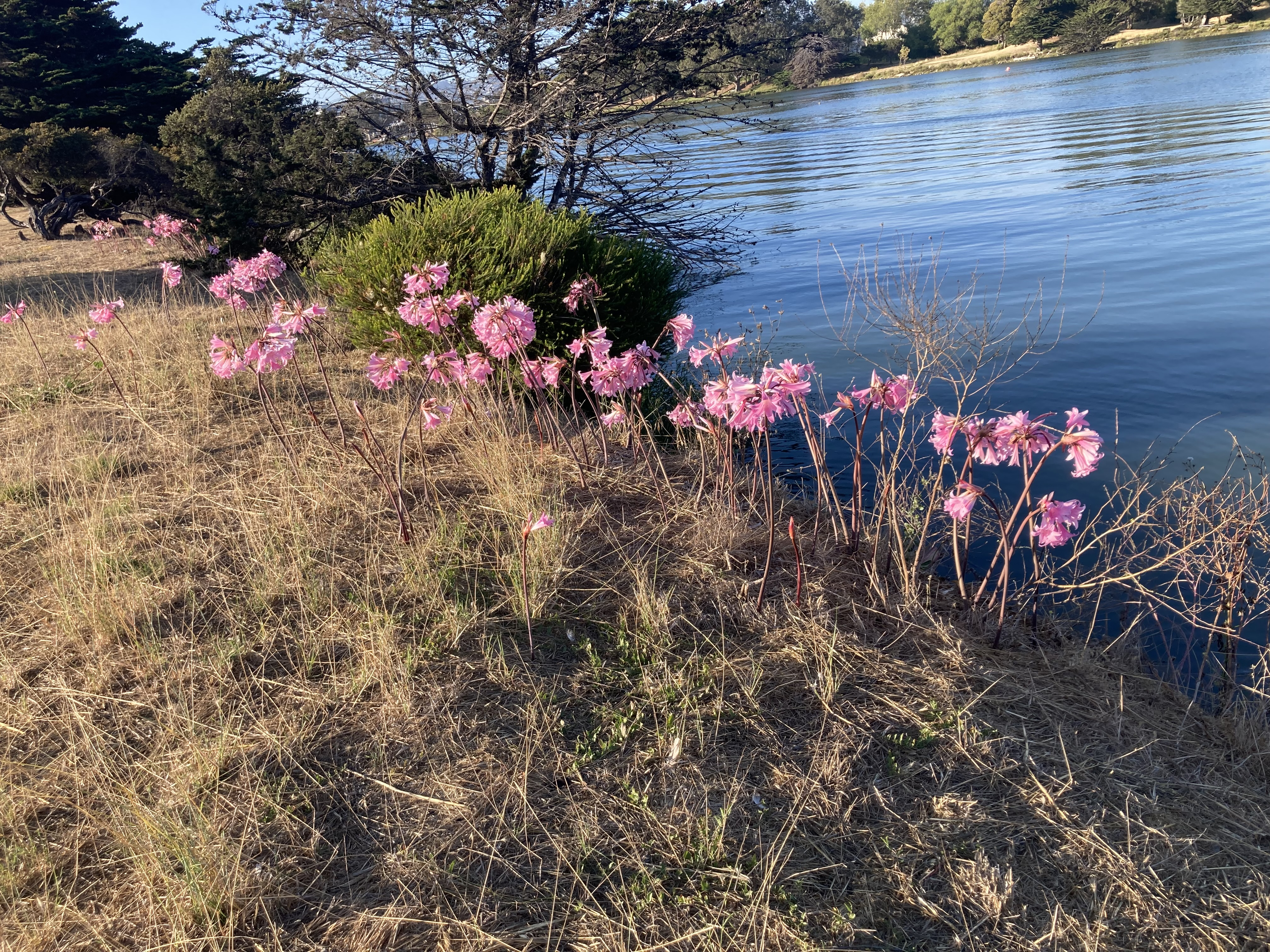
Amaryllis belladonna in Berkeley, California

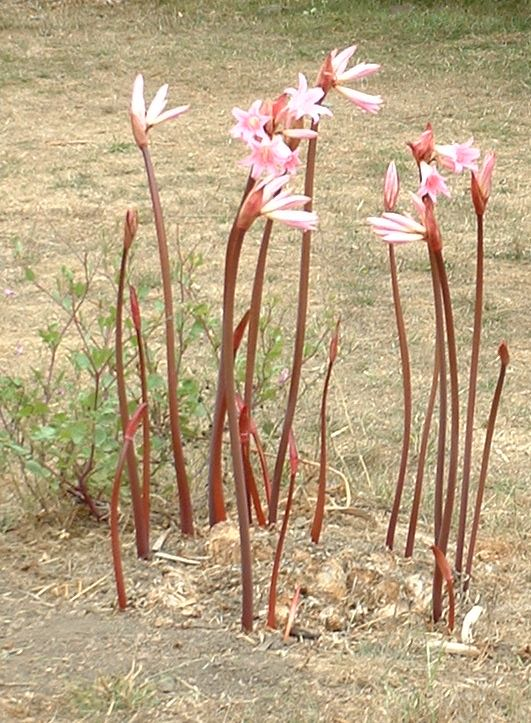
In California

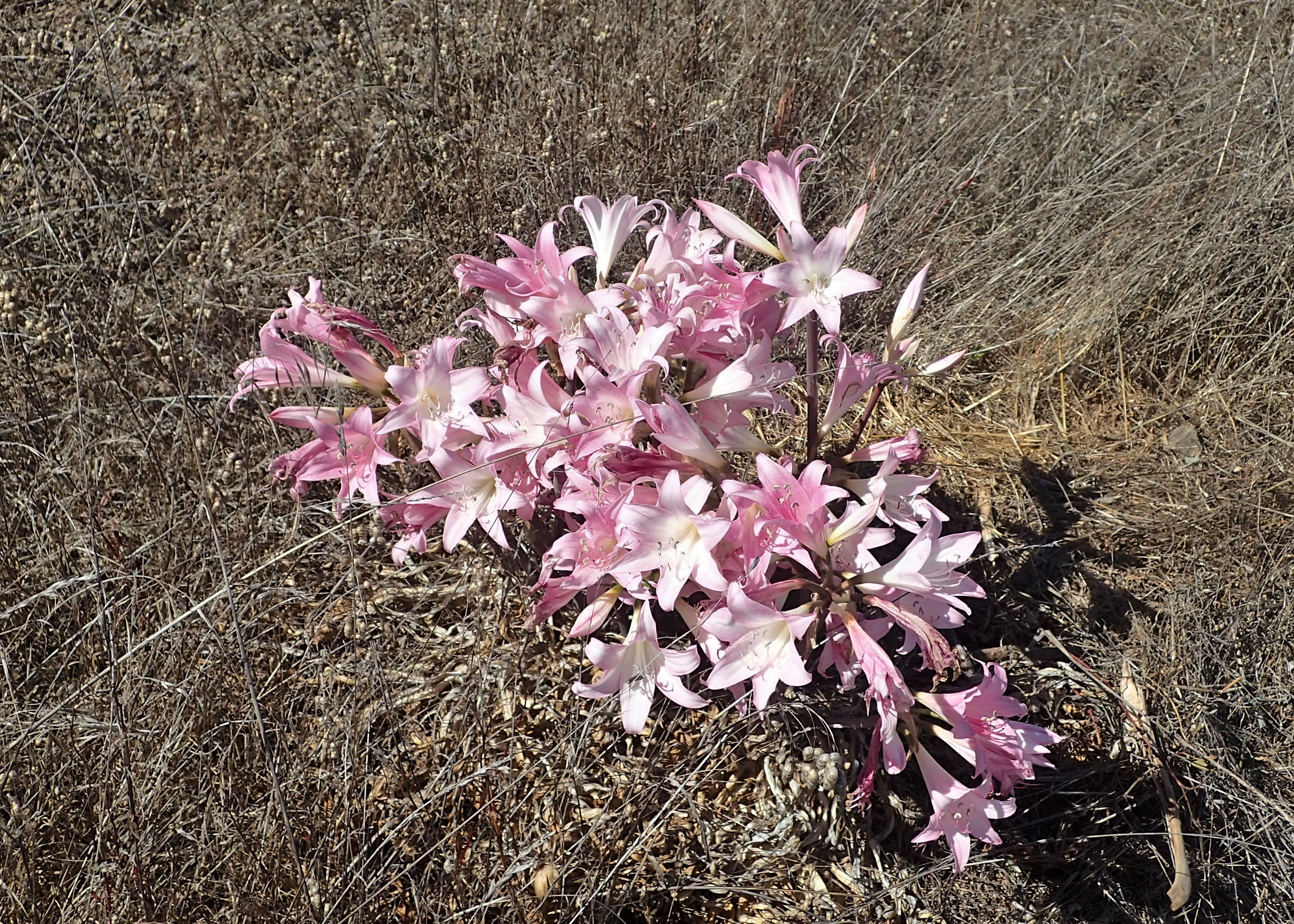
In Sonoma

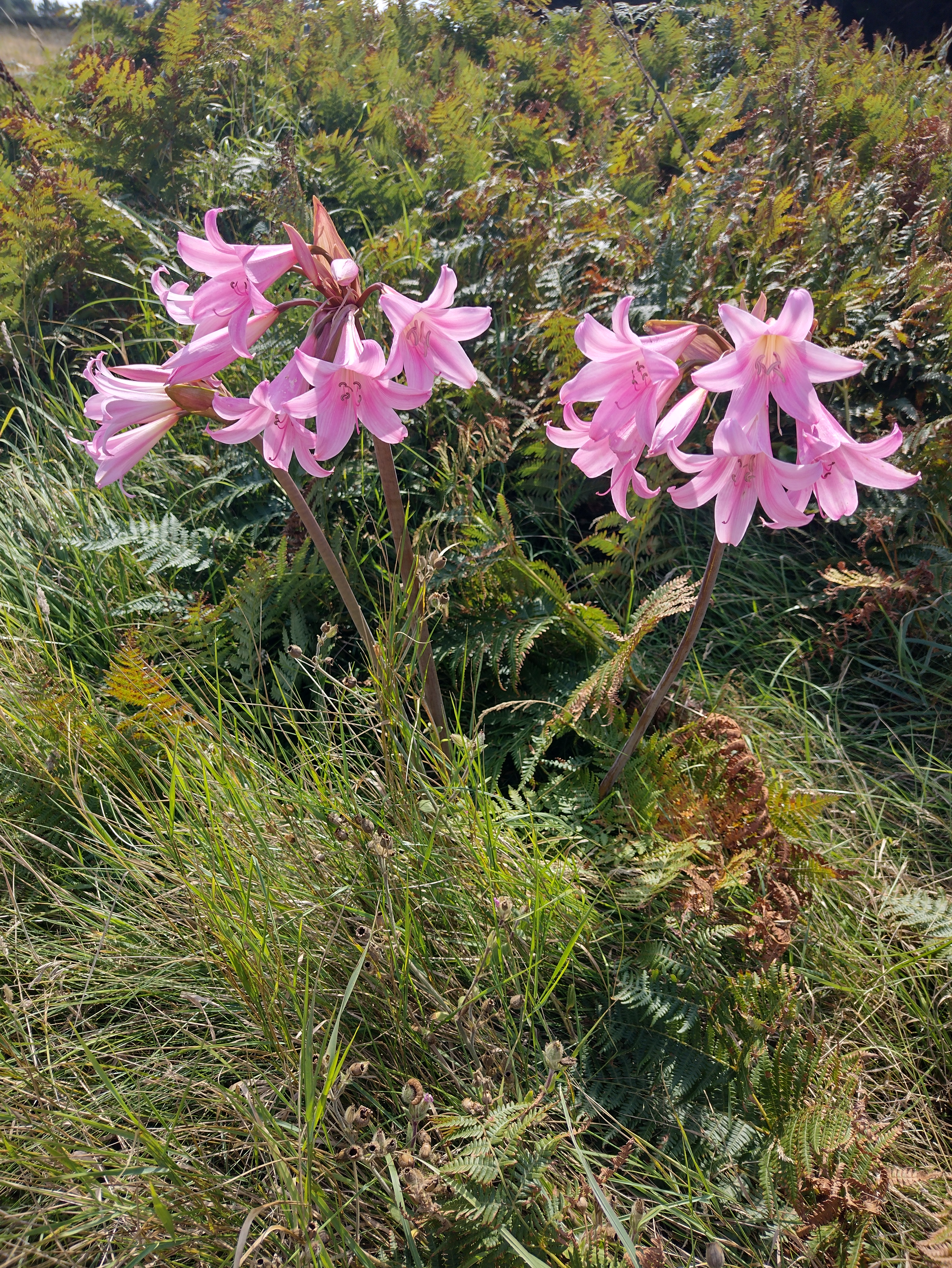
In the Isles of Scilly

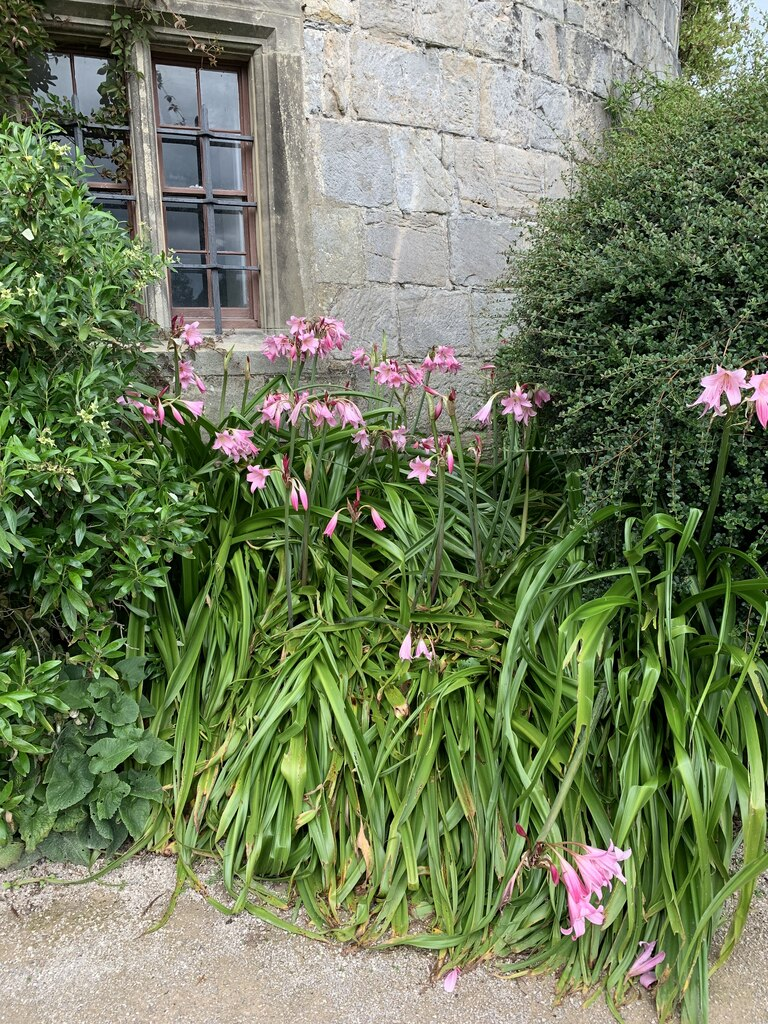
At Chirk Castle

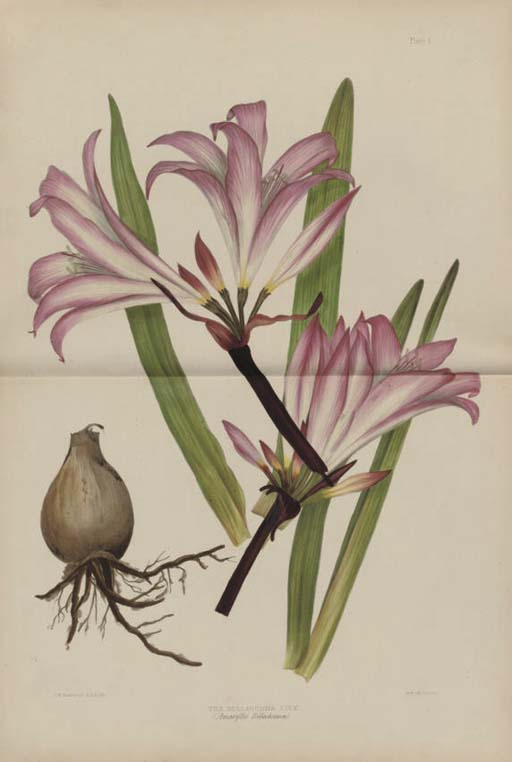
Illustration

Seeds

== See also ==
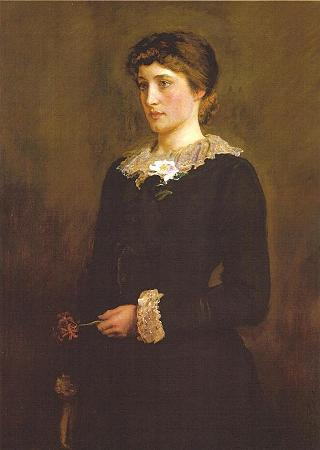
A Jersey Lily by John Everett Millais, 1878. Millais' painting made reference to the flower, popularising the nickname for Lillie Langtry.

- List of plants known as lily
- A Jersey Lily, an 1878 painting by John Everett Millais

== Bibliography ==
- RHS (2015). "Amaryllis belladonna: belladonna lily".
- Dressler, S.; Schmidt, M. & Zizka, G. (2014). "Amaryllis belladonna". African plants – a Photo Guide. Frankfurt/Main: Forschungsinstitut Senckenberg.
- Carter, Kathie. "Amaryllis. Amaryllis belladonna (Brunsvigia rosea) and Hippeastrum hybrids" (PDF). Center for Landscape and Urban Horticulture. Cooperative Extension/Botany Plant Sciences Dept. University California Riverside.
- Phipps, Nikki (9 February 2011). "Amaryllis Belladonna Planting – How To Grow Amaryllis Bulbs". Planting Flower Bulbs.
- Adams, T. (2001). "Amaryllis belladonna L." PlantZAfrica.com. South African National Biodiversity Institute.
