= A Jersey Lily =

Painting by John Everett Millais

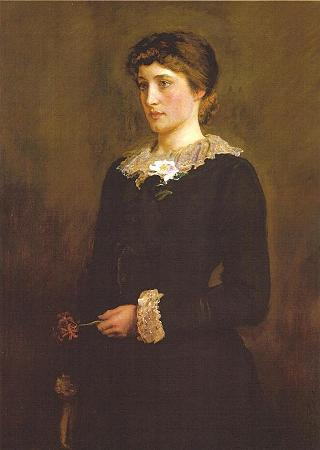
- Artist: John Everett Millais
- Year: 1878
- Type: Oil on canvas, portrait painting
- Dimensions: 109 cm × 85 cm (43 in × 33 in)
- Location: Jersey Museum and Art Gallery, Saint Helier

A Jersey Lily is an oil on canvas portrait painting by the British artist John Everett Millais, from 1878. It is a depiction of the actress Lily Langtry.

== History and description ==
A celebrated performer in the West End, Lily famously became the lover of the Prince of Wales, the future Edward VII. The title makes reference to her roots on the island of Jersey, in the Channel Islands, and the flower of the same name which she holds in her hand.

Although born in London, Millais was himself of Jersey parentage and grew up on the island, retaining a strong pride in his heritage. The painting was displayed at the Royal Academy Exhibition of 1878 at Burlington House, in Piccadilly. Due to the popularity of Langtry, large crowds gathered around the picture which had to be guarded by a police constable. Today it is the collection of the Jersey Museum and Art Gallery.

== See also ==
- List of paintings by John Everett Millais

== Bibliography ==
- Barlow, Paul. Time Present and Time Past: The Art of John Everett Millais. Routledge, 2017.
- Cox, Devon. The Street of Wonderful Possibilities: Whistler, Wilde and Sargent in Tite Street. Aurum, 2022.
