= Alexandre Antigna =

French painter (1817–1878)

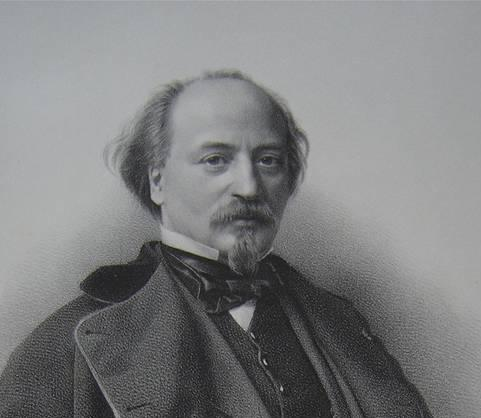
Alexandre Antigna

Jean Pierre Alexandre Antigna (March 7, 1817 – February 26, 1878) was a French painter.

== Early life and education ==
Antigna was born in Orléans, France, where his earliest training took place, under a local painter, François Salmon. On October 9, 1837, he entered the École nationale supérieure des Beaux-Arts in Paris where he was a pupil of Sebastien Norblin de la Gourdaine as well as the renowned Paul Delaroche.

== Career ==
Until 1845, Antigna's paintings were generally religious scenes and portraits.

After living in the poor quarter of the Île Saint-Louis in Paris, he incorporated images of the suffering and burden of the urban poor into his works. By the 1848 Revolution Antigna was devoted to the Realist style.

He continued to paint in the Realist style until circa 1860, when he began to produce paintings in the Naturalist vein. He exhibited at the Salon and received the Legion of Honour in 1861.

He traveled to Spain and Brittany numerous times in order to paint multifarious scenes, yet he always retained his compassion for the poor.

== Personal life ==
In 1861 Antigna married Hélène Marie Pettit, who became a painter herself. Their son, Andre-Marc Antigna, was also a painter and miniaturist.

Antigna died in Paris in 1878 at the age of 60.

== Works ==
- 1848 L'Éclair
- 1849 Après le Bain
- 1850 L'Incendie
- 1855 La Mort du Pauvre
- 1855 La Fête Dieu
- 1855 La Halte forcée
- 1862 Marchand d'images
- 1864 Miroir des bois
- 1864 Paysanne bretonne
- Year unknown Scene d'Atelier

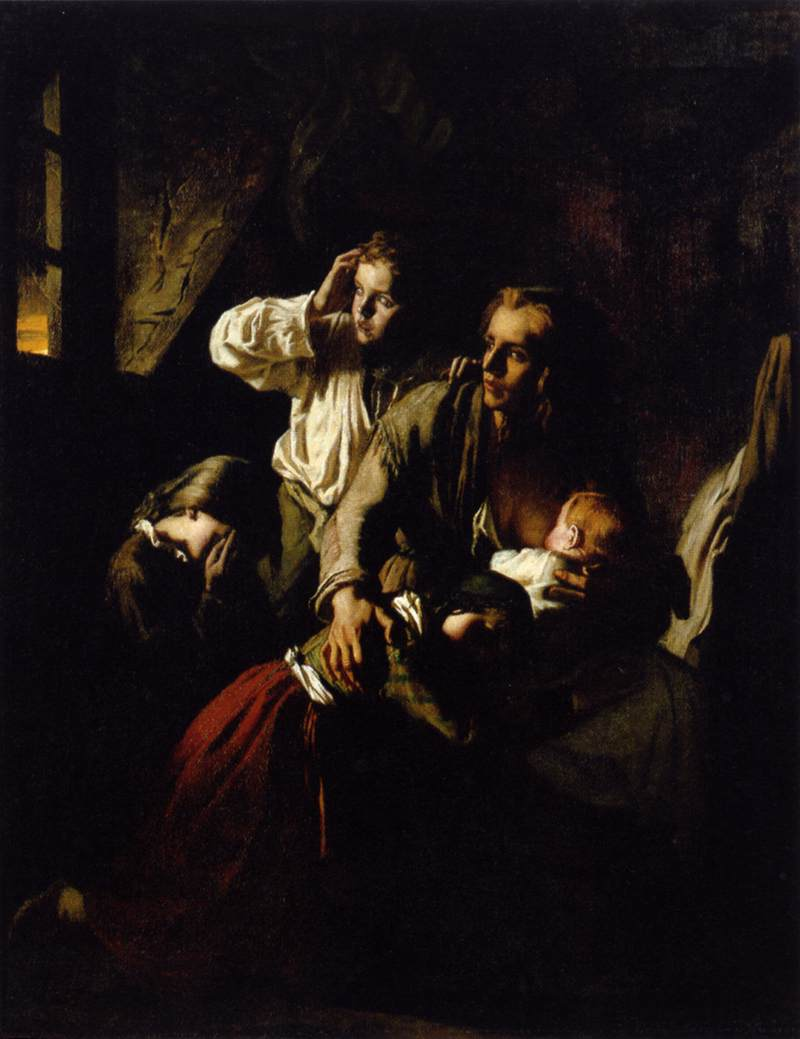
The Lightning, 1848

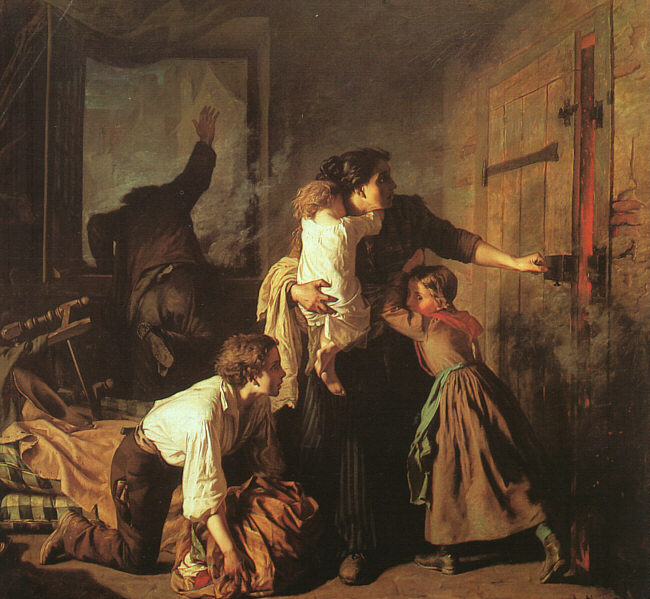
The Fire, 1850–51

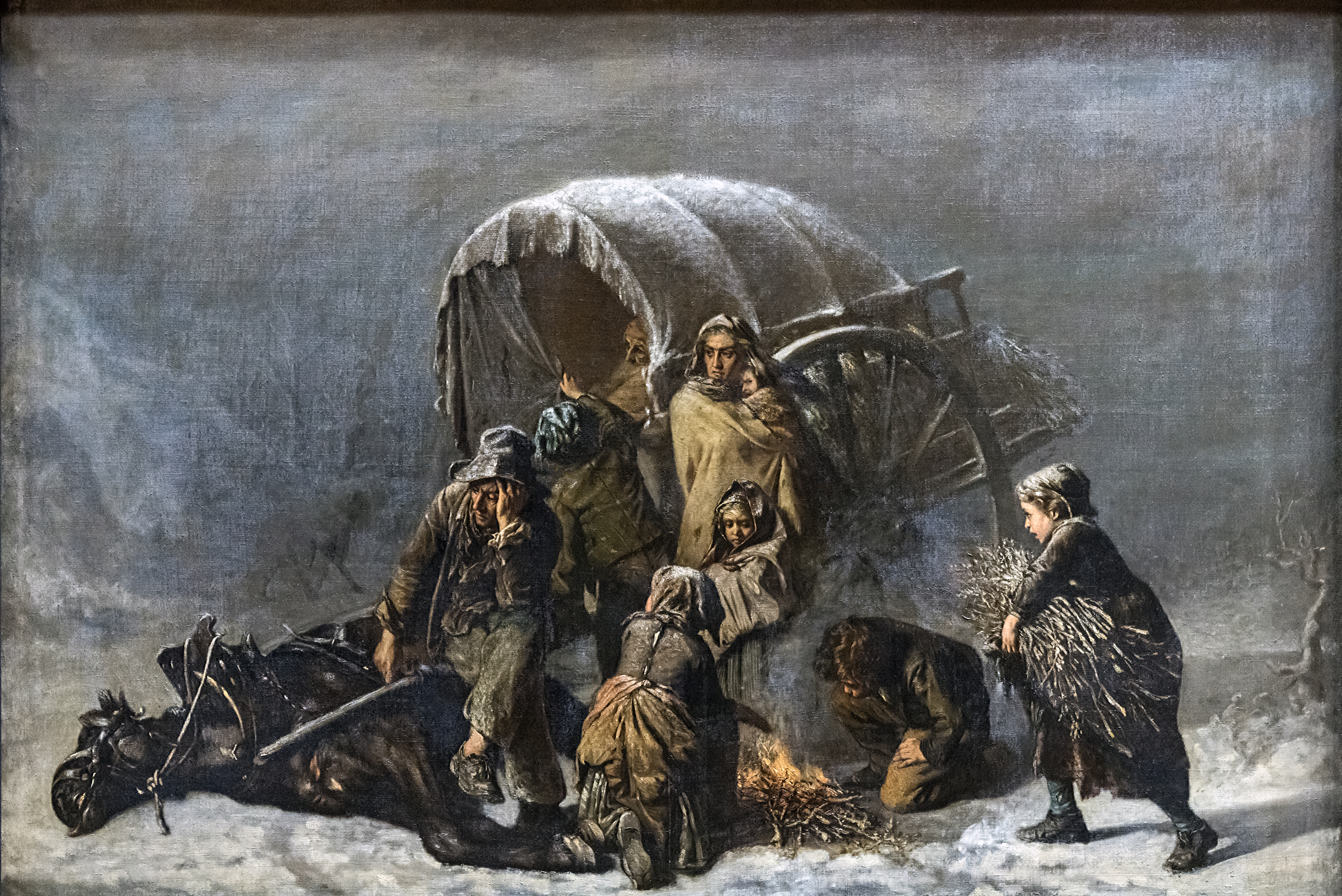
The forced stop 1855

La Fête-Dieu, 1855

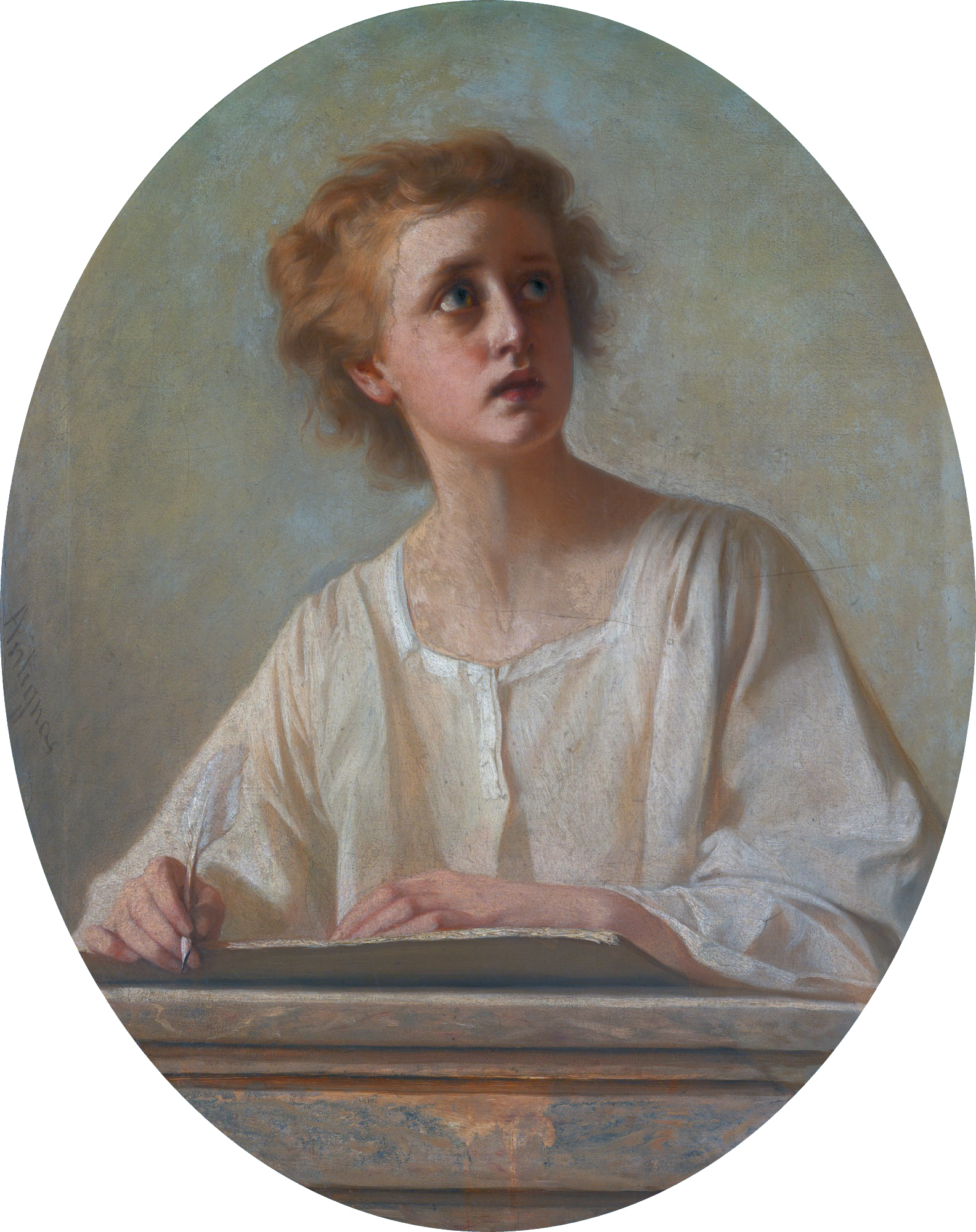
Child at a writing desk

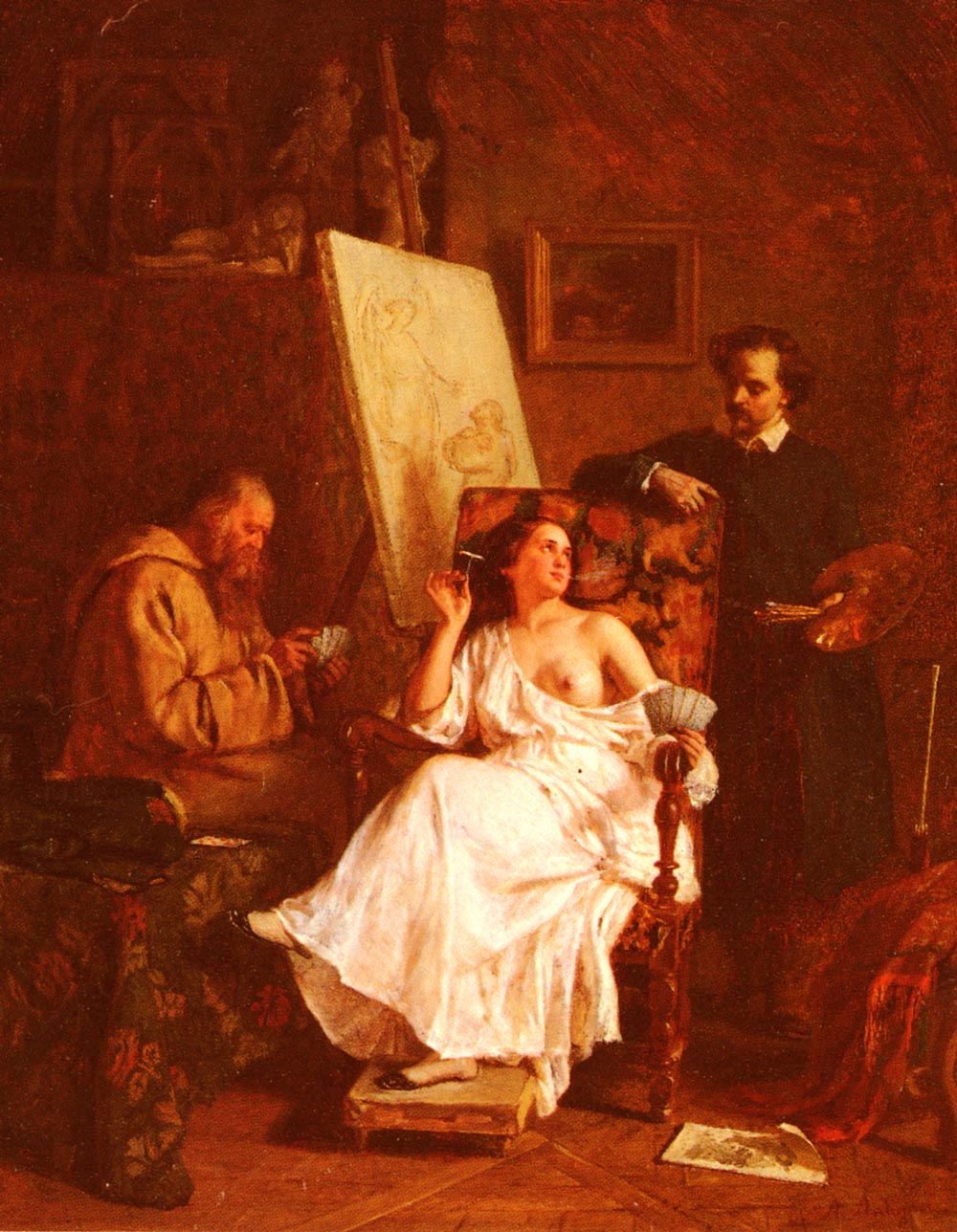
Scene from the studio
