= Gerda Höglund =

Swedish artist (1878–1973)

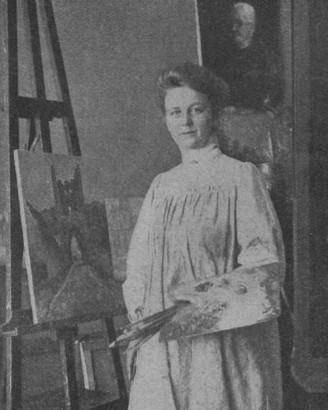
Gerda Höglund

Gerda Höglund (12 March 1878 – 25 March 1973) was a Swedish painter. After attending Kerstin Cardon's school in Stockholm, she moved to Paris where she continued her education at the Académie Julian. In addition to painting landscapes, still lifes, and portraits, she was one of the few 20th-century women who decorated Swedish churches. She began specializing in sacred art after she had been invited to paint an altarpiece for the Swedish church in Johannesburg. Her work can be seen today in 20 churches as well as in the Stockholm City Hall and in the Royal Swedish Academy of Music.

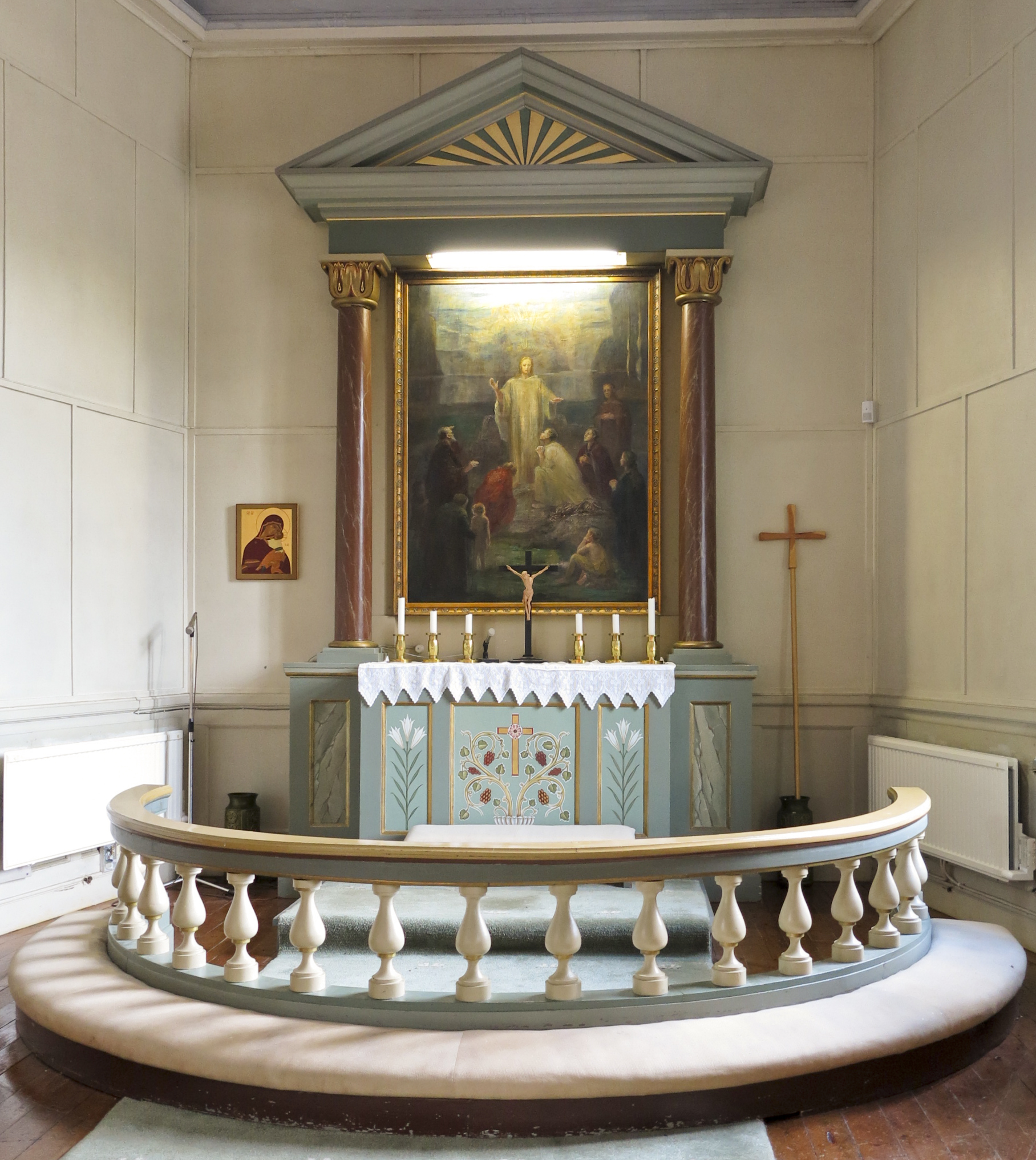
Höglund's altarpiece painting in Seskarö Church

== Biography ==
Born in Stockholm on 12 March 1878, Gerda Höglund was the daughter of the wholesaler and politician Otto Magnus Höglund and his wife Elin Clara Eugenia née Werner. She was the second of the family's three children. After attending Anna Sandström's girls' school, she trained in art at Kerstin Cardon's painting school and from 1900 to 1904 at the Académie Julian in Paris under Jean-Paul Laurens. Thereafter she made study trips to France, Germany, Italy and Great Britain.

Höglund initially became known as a landscape and portrait painter. In 1905, two of her portraits were accepted for the Paris spring exhibition. She received positive critical acclaim for the one depicting her mother. She also exhibited at the spring salon in 1908 with a portrait and in 1910 with two landscapes. On returning to Stockholm, as a member of the Föreningen Svenska Konstnärinnor (Women Artists Association), she exhibited at the Association's first exhibition in 1911. She also exhibited in Sweden in 1912 (in Lund), 1913 (in Malmö), and in Stockholm in 1917 and 1927 in the Liljevalch Gallery.

Höglund is remembered above all for the altarpieces she contributed to some 20 churches over a period of 40 years. These resulted from an invitation she received while in South Africa to decorate the Swedish church in Johannesburg; most of the Swedish churches she decorated are in the Diocese of Luleå and in the counties of Södermanland and Jönköping but she also painted an altarpiece for the Swedish Church in Hartlepool, England.

Gerda Höglund died in Stockholm on 25 March 1973, aged 95.
